= Taenia asiatica =

Scientific classification
- Kingdom: Animalia
- Phylum: Platyhelminthes
- Class: Cestoda
- Order: Cyclophyllidea
- Family: Taeniidae
- Genus: Taenia
- Species: T. asiatica

Binomial name
- Taenia asiatica Eom and Rim, 1993

Species of flatworm

Taenia asiatica, commonly known as Asian taenia or Asian tapeworm, is a parasitic tapeworm of humans and pigs. It is one of the three species of Taenia infecting humans and causes taeniasis. Discovered only in 1980s from Taiwan and other East Asian countries as an unusual species, it is so notoriously similar to Taenia saginata, the beef tapeworm, that it was for a time regarded as a slightly different strain. But anomaly arose as the tapeworm is not of cattle origin, but of pigs. Morphological details also showed significant variations, such as presence of rostellar hooks, shorter body, and fewer body segments. The scientific name designated was then Asian T. saginata. But the taxonomic consensus turns out to be that it is a unique species. It was in 1993 that two Korean parasitologists, Keeseon S. Eom and Han Jong Rim, provided the biological bases for classifying it into a separate species. The use of mitochondrial genome sequence and molecular phylogeny in the late 2000s established the taxonomic status.

T. asiatica causes intestinal taeniasis in humans and cysticercosis in pigs. There is a suspicion that it may also cause cysticercosis in human. Like other taeniids, humans are the definitive hosts, but in contrast, pigs, wild boars, as well as cattle can serve as intermediate hosts. Moreover, SCID mice and Mongolian gerbil can be experimentally infected. The life cycle is basically similar to those of other taenids. Humans contract the infection by eating raw or undercooked meat – a practice common in East and Southeast Asia – which is contaminated with the infective larva called cysticercus. Cysticercus develops into adult tapeworm in human intestine, from where it releases embryonated eggs along faeces into the external environment. Pigs acquire the eggs from vegetation. The eggs enter the digestive tract, which they penetrate to migrate to other body organs. Unlike other Taenia they preferentially settle in the liver, where they form cysticerci.

Asian taeniasis is documented in nine countries in Asia, including Taiwan, South Korea, Indonesia, the Philippines, Thailand, south-central China, Vietnam, Japan and Nepal. The rate of a prevalence is estimated to be up to 21% and resulting in annual economic losses of about US$40,000,000 in these regions. Praziquantel is the drug of choice for treating the infection. As the latest addition to human taeniasis, misidentified for over two centuries, still complete lack of systematic diagnosis, and no control programmes, it is regarded as the most neglected human taenid.

== Discovery ==
T. asiatica was first recognized in Taiwan, and subsequently in Korea and other Asian countries; therefore it was originally known as Asian T. saginata, as it appeared to be exclusive to Asia. From 1952 W. H. Huang and his team had recorded that taeniasis was highly prevalent in Taiwan under the assumption that T. saginata was the principal cause. In 1966 S.W. Huang began to suspect that the tapeworm could not be the conventional T. saginata for the obvious reason that the Taiwan aborigines hardly eat beef, and T. saginata is strictly a bovine tapeworm. From 1970s studies on the biology began to throw light to its difference from the classical T. saginata. Firstly the tapeworm infects visceral organs such as liver, serosa and lungs of pigs, and liver of cattle; while T. saginata is known to infect only the muscle of cattle. Secondly there are significant morphological variations though their resemblance is overwhelming. By the early 1990s the morphological and genetic differences were firmly established, but American and Australian parasitologists remained adamant as to its position as a separate biological species.

In 1992 two Korean parasitologists Keeseon S. Eom, from Chungbuk National University, and Han-Jong Rim, from Korea University, reported the transmission and larval stages (metacestodes) in naturally infected pigs. They also succeeded in experimentally infecting pigs in which cysticerci were formed in the liver. Further the metacestodes recovered from infected liver were used to infect a human volunteer, whom they had given two years earlier. They therefore proposed the scientific name Taenia saginata taiwanensis. They recovered the intact strobilae from the stool after giving the volunteer niclosamide. It was using these metacestodes, strobilae, and adult worms that they gave detailed morphological and anatomical comparisons and concluded it to be a novel species, Taenia asiatica, in 1993.

Even then scepticism still persisted. Considering the degree of variations between Taiwan strain and typical T. saginata, Taiwanese parasitologists such as P.C. Fan, C.Y Lin, C.C. Chen and W.C Chung from National Yang-Ming University designated it to a subspecies, and named it T. saginata asiatica. Based on critical assessment on the field reports, experimental infections, morphological and immunological studies available since 1981, they advocated this position. Independent research in Australia also supported the subspecies concept regardless of the genetic variations. But subsequent analyses including epidemiological studies, and phylogenetic analysis using random amplified polymorphic DNA imposed its validity as a distinct species. In 2005 the first complete sequence of its mitochondrial genome was published, and genetic comparison (Cox1gene) with those of Taenia solium and T. saginata provided further support to its taxonomic status. The complete sequence of mitochondrial genome of T. saginata in 2007, and the development of high-resolution multiplex PCR assay in 2009 finally established beyond doubt that it is indeed a new species. The two species separated 1.14 million years ago.

== Description ==
The body of Taenia asiatica is yellowish-white in colour, about 350 cm long and 1 cm broad, divided into the anterior scolex, followed by a short neck and a highly extended body proper called strobila. It is an acoelomate animal with no body cavity or digestive system. The scolex bears four simple suckers as attachment organs to the intestinal wall of the host. The distinct rostellum on the scolex, the large number of uterine twigs and the existence of posterior protuberance in adult are the defining characters. The rostellum is usually surrounded by two rows of rudimentary hooklets. In comparison, lack of rostellum and hooks is the defining feature of T. saginata. Moreover, the metacestode is different in having wart-like formations on the external surface of the bladder wall, which are absent in T. saginata. The strobila is composed of a chain of ribbon-like segments called proglottids. There are more than 700 proglottids in the strobila, but less than 1000 (~900), while T. saginata in comparison have more than 1000 proglottids. The proglottids are distinguishable into mature and gravid proglottids. Each mature proglottid contains a complete set of both male and female reproductive systems; hence it is hermaphrodite. Similar to T. saginata the uterus has 13 lateral branches in T. asiatica. The gravid proglottids are full of fertilised eggs. The number of eggs in gravid proglottids differs from 44,180 to 132,500, with an average number of 90,051. It is unique in having posterior protuberances in the gravid proglottid, which are absent in other taenids including T. saginata.

The cysticerci of T. asiatica are typically smaller than those of other human taenids. They possess two rows of rudimentary hooks, unlike T. saginata, which has none. In addition the protoscolex of cysticercus (metacestode) has a sunken rostellum, while that of T. saginata has only an apical pit.

== Life cycle ==
The life cycle of T asiatica is indirect and digenetic, and is completed in humans as the definitive host, and the intermediate host is mostly pigs (including wild boar in Taiwan), and possibly cattle on rare occasion. The complete life cycle is shortest among human taenids. Humans ingest the infective larvae called cysticercus from raw or undercooked meat, or viscera of pigs. The adult worm inhabits the small intestine where it gets attached to the mucosa using its suckers and rostellar hooklets. Upon sexual maturity it undergoes self-fertilisation. Fertilized eggs are released through the faeces along with the gravid proglottid which gets detached from the strobila. The number of proglottids released per day may vary from 0 to 35. Cysticercus grows into adult in about 2.5 to 4 months, by the time gravid proglottids are found in faeces.

Pigs and wild boars ingest the infective embryo while grazing. The digestive enzymes will break the thick shell of the egg and allow formation of the zygotes called "oncospheres". These oncospheres then penetrate the mucous layer of the digestive tract and enter the circulation of the host. This is where the young larval stages form a pea-sized, fluid filled cyst, also known as "cysticercus", which migrate to visceral organs like liver, serosa and lungs in pigs, and liver in cattle. In contrast to T. saginata, the larval development is short, taking about four weeks. Cystecerci have a predilection for liver.

== Pathogenesis ==
T. asiatica infection in human is usually asymptomatic. There was an isolated report of severe pathogenic lesions in a 60-year-old woman admitted to Mackay Memorial Hospital in Taiwan. Using endoscopy she was diagnosed with multiple erosions and active bleeding from ulcers in the stomach and duodenum caused by a single tapeworm. A year later she returned with intermittent epigastric pain, which she reported having had for several months. Again a tapeworm was seen. The tapeworm species was not identified but was suspected to be T. asiatica, because the woman ate pork liver at a festival, and the common pork tapeworm T. solium is mostly found in pig muscle.

In pigs cysticercus has a tendency to produce cysticercosis. Cysts are formed in vital organs such as liver and lungs. T. saginata only causes cysticercosis in cattle (not humans). As its life cycle and mode of development are very similar to those of Taenia solium, which is the major cause of neurocysticercosis, a possibility that T. asiatica can cause cysticercosis in humans is highly conjectured.

== Epidemiology ==
The parasite is known in Asian countries including Taiwan, Korea, Indonesia, Nepal, Thailand and China. In addition, molecular genotyping techniques have revealed that the disease also occurs in Japan, the Philippines, and Vietnam.

== Diagnosis ==
The basic diagnosis is examination of a stool sample to find the parasite eggs. However, there is a serious limitation as to the identification of the species because the eggs of all human taenids look the same. Even with the proglottids it is extremely difficult to identify T. asiatica from other taenids because of their striking resemblances. The species and T. saginata are frequently confused due to their morphological similarities and sympatric distribution. Identification often requires histological observation of the uterine branches and PCR detection of ribosomal 5.8S gene. The presence of rostellum on the scolex, a large number of uterine branches (more than 57) and prominent posterior protuberances in gravid proglottids, and wart-like formation on the surface of the larvae are the distinguishing structures.

To date the most relevant diagnosis of taeniasis due to T. asiatica is by enzyme-linked immunoelectrotransfer blot (EITB). EITB can effectively identify it from other taenid infections since serological test indicates that immunoblot band of 21.5 kDa exhibited specificity only to T. asiatica. Even though it gives 100% sensitivity, it has not been tested with human sera for cross-reactivity, and it may show a high false positive result. Loop-mediated isothermal amplification (LAMP) is highly sensitive (~2.5 times that of multiplex PCR), without false positive, for differentiating the taenid species from faecal samples.

== Treatment ==
Niclosamide (2 mg) is very effective against experimental infection in human. In general cestode infections are treated with praziquantel and albendazole. Atrabine is quite effective but indicates adverse effects in humans. The commonly used drugs for tapeworms, benzimidazoles are relatively ineffective. Praziquantel at a single dose of 150 mg is the most effective medication against T. asiatica without causing side effects.
