= Neurocysticercosis =

Cysticercosis of the brain

- Magnetic resonance image of a patient with neurocysticercosis demonstrating multiple cysticerci within the brain
- Specialty: Infectious diseases

Neurocysticercosis (NCC) is a parasitic infection of the nervous system caused by the larvae of the tapeworm Taenia solium, also known as the "pork tapeworm". The disease is primarily transmitted through direct contact with human feces, often through the consumption of food or water containing Taenia solium eggs. These eggs hatch in the small intestine and penetrate the intestinal wall. The larvae can travel to the brain, muscles, eyes, and skin. Neurocysticercosis, caused by Taenia solium larvae, differs from taeniasis, which results from adult tapeworm infection.

Neurocysticercosis manifests with various signs and symptoms, influenced by the location, number of lesions, and immune response. While some people may have no symptoms, others may experience seizures, increased pressure in the skull, cognitive impairment, or specific neurological problems. In severe cases, the condition can be life-threatening.

Diagnosis relies on imaging and blood tests. Neurocysticercosis can be prevented through improved sanitation, education, awareness, de-worming and vaccines for endemic areas. Treatment options depend on cyst viability, the host's immune response, and the location and number of lesions. Symptoms are treated with anti-seizure, antiedema, pain, or anti-inflammatory drugs. Surgery, steroids, or other medications are used to treat intracranial hypertension. Anti-parasitic medications are used for treating earlier stages of the disease. Steroids are used to manage inflammation in the central nervous system. Surgery can be used to remove cysts.

Neurocysticercosis is common in developing regions, such as Latin America, China, Nepal, Africa, India, and Southeast Asia. Although rare in Europe and the US, immigration has increased its prevalence. Taenia solium has been recognized since 1500 BC and found in ancient Egyptian mummies. The first recorded cases of neurocysticercosis were likely in 1558. In the 19th century, German pathologists found similarities between T. solium and cysticercus scolex and discovered that consumption of cysticercus in pork caused human intestinal taeniasis.

== Signs and symptoms ==
Neurocysticercosis has a wide range of signs and symptoms, which relate to the location, number of lesions, and immune system's response to the infection. Ranging from asymptomatic to deadly, neurocysticercosis has been referred to as the "great imitator" as it can mimic many other neurological disorders. The most common symptoms are seizures, intracranial hypertension, cognitive impairment, and focal deficits.

Manifestations of neurocysticercosis
Location	Form of the disease	Common clinical manifestations
Brain parenchyma	Vesicular cysts	Seizures; sometimes asymptomatic.
Brain parenchyma	Colloidal cysts	Seizures; vomiting; headache; focal signs.
Brain parenchyma	Granulomas/calcifications	Seizures, sometimes reoccurring.
Brain parenchyma	Cysticercotic encephalitis	Seizures; coma; intracranial hypertension.
Subarachnoid space	Giant cysts in CSF cisterns	Seizures; focal signs; intracranial hypertension; cognitive impairment.
Subarachnoid space	Diffuse arachnoiditis (inflammation of the arachnoid)	Focal signs; intracranial hypertension.
Subarachnoid space	Hydrocephalus	Intracranial hypertension; cognitive impairment.
Subarachnoid space	Angiitis	Acute stroke syndromes.
Ventricular system	Ventricular cysts	Focal signs; intracranial hypertension
Ventricular system	Ependymitis (inflammation of the ependyma)	Seizures; intracranial hypertension
Spinal cord	Arachnoiditis	Root pain; weakness; rarely meningitis
Spinal cord	Parenchymal cysts	Motor and sensory signs below the level of the lesion
Other	Suprasellar cysticercosis	Ophthalmologic and endocrinologic disturbances
Other	Ophthalmic cysticercosis	Visual loss; extraocular muscle paralysis
Other	Muscle cysticercosis	Muscle pseudohypertrophy

=== Seizures ===
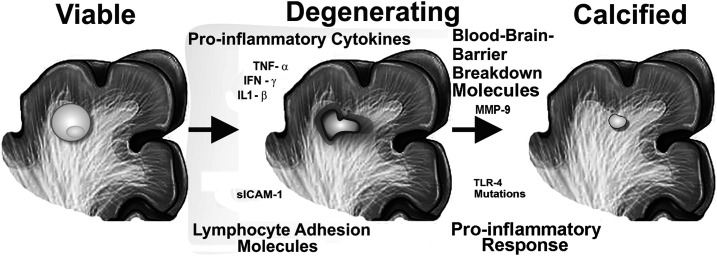
The figure summarizes the stages of NCC lesions: living viable cysts (left), degenerating dying lesions with inflammation (center), and dead calcified lesions (right). Markers that are increased in those with active epilepsy compared with NCC-infected subjects without epilepsy are shown: 1) pro-inflammatory cytokines (tumor necrosis factor-α, interferon-γ, and interleukin 1-β) and blood–brain barrier breakdown molecules (MMP-9); 2) lymphocyte adhesion molecules; and 3) mutations in regulators of lymphocyte adhesion (Toll-like receptor 4) associated with pro-inflammatory conditions.

Epilepsy is the most common symptom of neurocysticercosis; neurocysticercosis is the primary cause of late-onset seizures in countries with middle and low incomes. Seizures are more common in parenchymal neurocysticercosis than in other forms of neurocysticercosis; they can occur at any stage of the disease. If neurocysticercosis is left untreated, seizures often persist and recur despite treatment. Seizures are more commonly associated with degenerating cysts, which are often accompanied by swelling, inflammation, nerve damage, and gliosis. They are caused by inflammatory responses in the brain and the space-occupying effect of the cysts. Multiple lesions increase the risk of seizures. Active cysts are associated with first-time seizures while calcified granulomas are associated with chronic epilepsy.

=== Focal deficits ===
Those with neurocysticercosis can exhibit a variety of specific neurologic symptoms determined by the size, number, and location of the parasites. Pyramidal tract symptoms, such as weakness, Babinski's sign, spasticity, and overactive reflexes are the most common. Sensory impairments, parkinsonian rigidity, involuntary movements, language disturbances, and signs of brain-stem dysfunction can also occur. Focal neurologic symptoms are most commonly seen in those with large subarachnoid cysts compressing the brain parenchyma. Inflammation in the arachnoid layer can cause focal signs, ischaemic strokes caused by intracranial artery blockage, cranial nerve compression, hearing loss, and facial nerve palsy or trigeminal neuralgia. There may also be focal neurological symptoms caused by brainstem damage. Cysticercosis of the spinal cord often causes radicular pain, weakness, and sensory impairments due to localized mass effects or inflammation in the subarachnoid space.

=== Intracranial hypertension ===
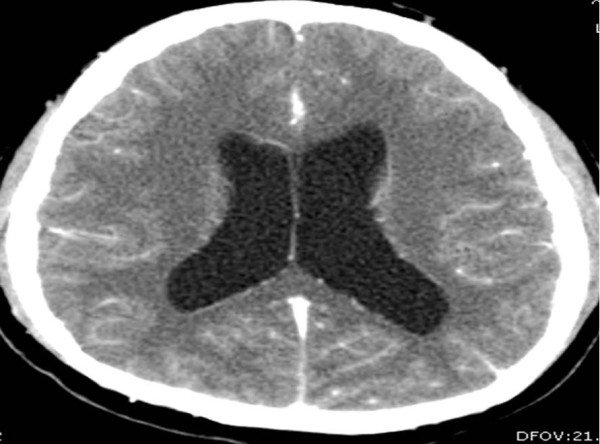
CT scan of the head of a patient with neurocysticercosis showing presence of hydrocephalus and dilation of ventricles

Intracranial hypertension – a build-up of pressure around the brain – is associated with neurocysticercosis and may be accompanied by other symptoms. More common in extraparenchymal neurocysticercosis, it is most frequently caused by buildup of cerebrospinal fluid (CSF) in the brain. Hydrocephalus can be related to granular ependymitis, compression of the CSF pathways by cysts, cysticercotic arachnoiditis, and inflammation or cysts blocking ventricles. Large subarachnoid cysts and cyst clumps can also cause a mass effect and intracranial hypertension, with or without hydrocephalus. Intracranial hypertension can present as episodic loss of consciousness when moving the head, known as Bruns syndrome; it may be subacute or chronic. Cysticercotic encephalitis, which is a severe type of neurocysticercosis usually affecting younger women and children, can also cause intracranial hypertension. Cysticercotic encephalitis is characterized by seizures, intracranial hypertension, clouding of consciousness, optic disc swelling, headache, reduction of visual acuity, and vomiting.

=== Cognitive and psychiatric disturbances ===
Cognitive and psychiatric manifestations of neurocysticercosis can range from mild deficits to severe dementia. Episodes of psychosis which involve paranoia, confusion, and violent behaviour have been reported to occur with neurocysticercosis. Some of these episodes could be associated with psychomotor epilepsy or post-seizure psychosis. Other psychiatric symptoms of neurocysticercosis include anxiety, delirium, sensory changes, depression, and personality disorders. Those with neurocysticercosis may exhibit depression, cognitive impairments, or a decline in quality of life.

=== Other symptoms ===
Spinal arachnoiditis can cause subacute root pain and weakness. Cysts in the spinal cord are typically associated with motor and sensory impairments that vary depending on the location of the lesion. Those with cysticerci in the sellar region may have vision and hormonal issues. In the eyes, cysticerci are usually found in the subretinal space, causing a gradual reduction in visual acuity or visual field abnormalities. The cysts can cause inflammation of the vitreous membrane, uveitis, and endophthalmitis, which is the most serious complication of ocular cysticercosis and can result in eye shrinkage. Cysticercal infection in striated muscles can cause weakening and enlargement over time.

== Causes and mechanism ==
Taenia solium, otherwise known as "the pork tapeworm", is a tapeworm in the Cestoda class and is a species of the genus Taenia. Taenia solium is a unique tapeworm because it can infect humans in two ways: as a definitive host (where the adult worm lives in the intestines, known as taeniasis) and as an intermediate host (where the larvae develop in tissues, known as cysticercosis).

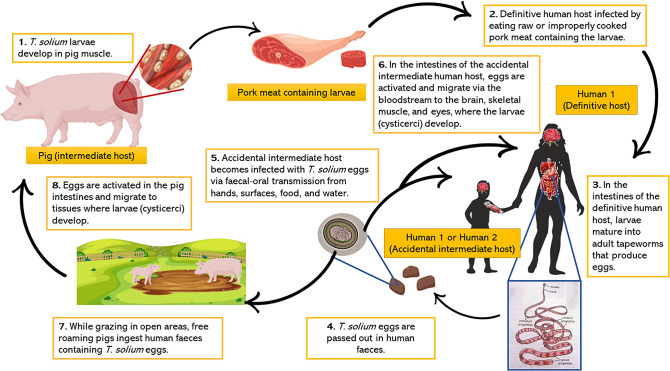
Life cycle of Taenia solium

The normal life cycle of Taenia solium involves humans as the definitive host and pigs as the intermediate host. The adult worm lives in the human small intestine and can grow up to 10 meters, though most reach 2–3 meters. Its head (scolex) is small (about 1 mm), round, and has 22–32 hooks arranged in two rows. Since pigs eat feces, the eggs remain in waste, increasing the chance of transmission.

In geographical areas where Taenia solium is common, poor sanitation and free-roaming pigs make it easy for pigs to consume human feces or contaminated food scraps. Once a tapeworm egg enters a pig's intestine, it hatches into a larva called an oncosphere. This larva penetrates the intestinal wall, enters the bloodstream, and travels through the body until it settles in a tissue site. There, it develops into a cysticercus—a fluid-filled sac containing an immature tapeworm head (protoscolex). When a human eats undercooked infected pork, the protoscolex attaches to the intestine and matures into an adult worm.

The life cycle of Taenia solium is completed when humans eat raw or undercooked pork containing mature cysticerci. However, humans more commonly become infected by ingesting tapeworm eggs through contaminated food or water. When Taenia solium larvae is ingested, the larvae hatches in the intestines and the oncospheres penetrate the intestinal mucosa before migrating to other parts of the body such as the CNS where they develop into vesicular (viable) cysticerci. Since Taenia solium proglottids are not motile and may break apart before being passed, infected feces can contain a high concentration of eggs. Contact with such feces can lead to infection with multiple cysticerci. These cysts take about three months to mature, and their effects depend on their number and location in the body.

As the immune system responds to cysticerci in the brain, cysticerci go through three different stages; first becoming inflamed (colloidal stage), then breaking down (granular stage), and finally turning into hardened nodules (calcified stage). Some cysticerci remain in the viable stage for years. During the colloidal stage, the inflammation can cause damage to the brain tissue, swelling, scarring, and damage to nerve cells. In the later granular and calcified stages, swelling decreases, however scarring and clusters of immune cells in the brain (brain granulomas) may remain.

== Diagnosis ==
Diagnosing neurocysticercosis can be challenging, especially in resource-limited areas, as available methods are often unreliable or inaccessible. Physical examination and laboratory testing are often not helpful in diagnosing neurocysticercosis. Diagnosis mainly relies on neuroimaging and blood tests. Diagnostic criteria were created by Del Brutto et al to help with the diagnostic process. When diagnosing neurocysticercosis, physicians may ask the affected individual about a potential history of exposure, such as contact with others who are infected with Taenia solium, or time spent in an area where Taenia solium is endemic.

=== Immunodiagnosis ===
The lentil lectin purified glycoprotein (LLGP) enzyme-linked immunoelectrotransfer blot (EITB) assay, is the most reliable test for detecting T. solium antibodies in the blood. This method uses specific proteins to identify the presence of these antibodies. Antibodies can be identified in EITB as early as five weeks after infection. The LLGP-EITB has a sensitivity of 98% for individuals with multiple brain cysts and a specificity of 100%. However, its sensitivity is lower in cases with just one cyst. The ELISA test for detecting anticysticercal antibodies in cerebrospinal fluid (CSF) is 89% sensitive and 93% specific for active neurocysticercosis infections. It is often used as an alternative when the EITB test is unavailable.

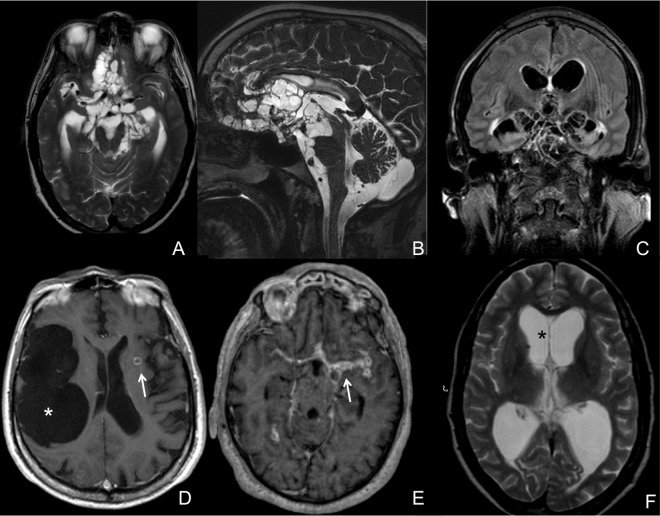
Different presentation patterns of extraparenchymal neurocysticercosis as revealed by brain MRI

As many as 37% of those with neurocysticercosis have high eosinophils, making it the most common blood abnormality in neurocysticercosis. The number of people with positive stool tests for Taenia solium eggs in neurocysticercosis varies and seems to depend on how severe the infection is. Recognizing Taenia eggs is difficult, and many cases may go undetected during testing.

=== Neuroimaging ===
CT scans and magnetic resonance imaging (MRI) give objective information about the number and pattern of lesions, the stage of healing, and how the immune system is responding to the parasites. MRIs are better for evaluating different spatial planes and provides clearer images, which helps in identifying small lesions at the back of the brain or near the skull that may be missed on CT scans. CT scans are more sensitive at detecting calcium buildup in the brain due to its ability detect calcifications in the brain.

Live vesicular cysts are small, round lesions with little swelling around them and do not need contrast for imaging. The tapeworm head (scolex) usually appears as an asymmetric nodule inside the cysts. Multiple live cysts with these heads corroborate the diagnosis. Once the cysts begin to break down (colloid cysts), their borders become unclear, they are surrounded by swelling and exhibit significant ring or nodular contrast enhancement. Calcified cysticerci are shown on CT scans as non-enhancing hyperdense nodules without swelling.

=== Diagnostic criteria ===
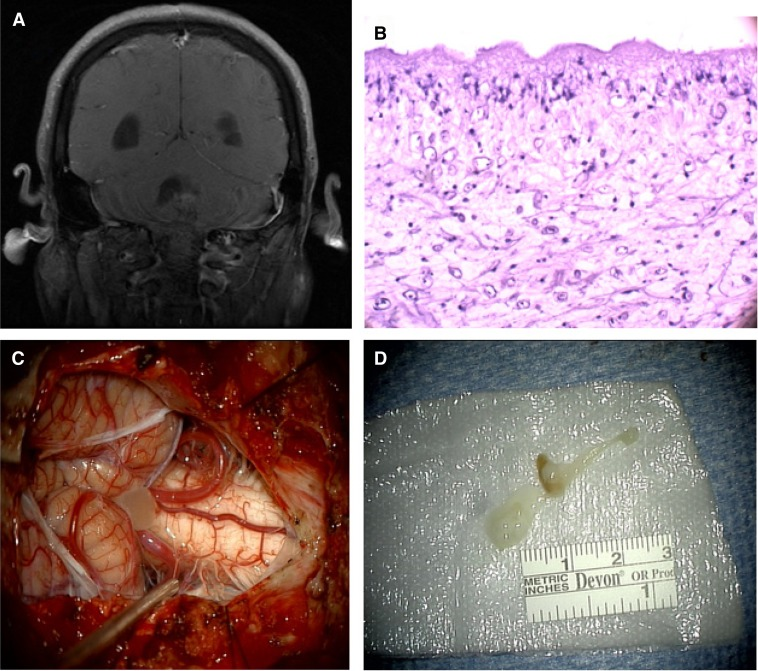
(A) Gadolinium-enhanced magnetic resonance imaging (MRI) of the brain showing evidence of a fourth ventricular cystic structure. (B) Histopathology of a surgically removed cyst with i) cuticular layer with microvilli, ii) cellular layer, and iii) reticular layer. (C) Dissected cyst (neurocysticercosis) protruding from fourth ventricle. (D) Cyst post-excision.

Neurocysticercosis diagnostic criteria:

- Absolute criteria:
  - Confirmation of the parasite through tissue analysis from a biopsy of a brain or spinal cord lesion.
  - Visualization of cysticercus under the retina.
  - Clear evidence of a scolex (head of the tapeworm) within a cystic lesion (Note: Round, well-defined lesions filled with fluid that looks similar to cerebrospinal fluid on CT or MRI scans.) on neuroimaging studies.
- Neuroimaging criteria:
  - Major neuroimaging criteria:
    - Cystic lesions without a visible scolex.
    - Enhancing lesions. (Note: One or more ring-shaped or nodular lesions, 10–20mm in size, with or without swelling, without displacing midline structures.)
    - Cystic lesions with multiple lobes in the subarachnoid space.
    - Typical parenchymal brain calcifications. (Note: One or more solid lesions, usually smaller than 10mm.)
  - Confirmative neuroimaging criteria:
    - Resolution of cystic lesions after antiparasitic drug therapy.
    - Spontaneous resolution of single small enhancing lesions. (Note: The administration of corticosteroids renders this criterion invalid.)
    - Migration of ventricular cysts (Note: Follow-up CT or MRI scans show that the locations of the cystic lesions in the ventricles change over time.) documented on sequential neuroimaging studies.
  - Minor neuroimaging criteria:
    - Obstructive hydrocephalus (symmetric or asymmetric) or abnormal enhancement of basal leptomeninges.
- Clinical/exposure criteria:
  - Major clinical/exposure:
    - Detection of specific antibodies or antigens related to cysticercosis by well-standardized immunodiagnostic tests. (Note: Antibody identification by enzyme-linked immunoelectrotransfer blot test employing lentil lectin-purified T. solium antigens, and cysticercal antigen detection by monoclonal antibody-based ELISA.)
    - Cysticercosis outside the central nervous system. (Note: Cysticerci can be identified through a biopsy of subcutaneous lumps, X-ray films or CT scans that reveal cigar-shaped calcifications in soft tissues, or detection of the parasite in the anterior chamber of the eye.)
    - Evidence of household contact with T. solium infection.
  - Minor clinical/exposure:
    - Clinical manifestations suggestive of neurocysticercosis. (Note: Mostly seizures (typically beginning in persons aged 20–49 years; the diagnosis of seizures in this setting is not disregarded if patients are outside of the normal age range), but other signs include chronic headaches, focal neurologic impairments, intracranial hypertension, and cognitive deterioration.)
    - Individuals coming from or living in an area where cysticercosis is endemic. (Note: A location where active transmission is recorded.)

=== Classification ===
Neurocysticercosis can be classified into two main types: parenchymal, which affects the brain tissue, and extraparenchymal, which occurs outside the brain tissue.

- Parenchymal neurocysticercosis: neurocysticercosis lesions within brain parenchyma.
  - Viable parenchymal cysts: contains the scolex, typically between 0.5 and 2 cm in diameter.
  - Single enhancing lesion (solitary cysticercal granuloma): One or two smaller cysts.
  - Massive infections: hundreds of cysts and a large number of larvae.
- Extraparenchymal neurocysticercosis: lesions in ventricles or subarachnoid spaces.
  - Ventricular neurocysticercosis: cysts in the brain ventricles.
  - Subarachnoid neurocysticercosis: cysticerci in the subarachnoid space.
- Other locations
  - Spinal neurocysticercosis: neurocysticercosis in the spine, often the extramedullary subarachnoid spaces.
  - Retinal neurocysticercosis: cysts effecting the retina.

== Prevention ==
Neurocysticercosis is preventable. Some factors that make T. solium potentially eradicable are humans being the only definitive host, the intermediate host being an animal whose exposure to ova can be controlled, well-developed diagnostic testing allowing infected individuals to be identified, effective treatments available, and the availability of pig vaccines.

Neurocysticercosis is more prevalent in areas where the transmission of T. solium is more likely, such as areas with improper disposal of waste, lower levels of education, improper slaughter of pigs, and free-roaming pigs. Unsanitary conditions and domestic pigs are required for T. solium to be transmitted. Urbanization and development reduce these factors, therefore transmission goes down. Because neurocysticercosis takes years to develop, intervention programs can take decades.

To prevent neurocysticercosis, interventions such as increasing education, improving sanitary conditions, and strict animal husbandry and meat inspection procedures are needed. Medical prevention includes de-worming people with medications such as niclosamide or praziquantel, and vaccinating and treating pigs with oxfendazole. Raised awareness of neurocysticercosis in non-endemic countries where rates are increasing is also important. The TSOL18 vaccine, which is made up of a recombinant protein from a T. solium oncosphere is a promising solution for the prevention and control of neurocysticercosis. Increasing public health surveillance, such as obligatory notification of neurocysticercosis cases, could also be beneficial. Properly identifying neurocysticercosis is needed to target interventions.

Praziquantel was used for de-worming in Ecuador in 1985, and eventually in other countries. In Honduras, transmission and morbidity decreased after health education and control programs. A program involving human and porcine mass chemotherapy, pig vaccines, and stool coproantigen case confirmation eliminated transmission in 105 out of 107 villages.

== Treatment ==
A single treatment method is not appropriate for every person with neurocysticercosis. The disease has to be characterized in terms of cyst viability, the degree of the host's immunological response to the parasite, and the location and number of lesions to provide proper treatment. Symptomatic and antiparasitic medications are typically used in conjunction for treatment. Surgery can also be used to remove cysts.

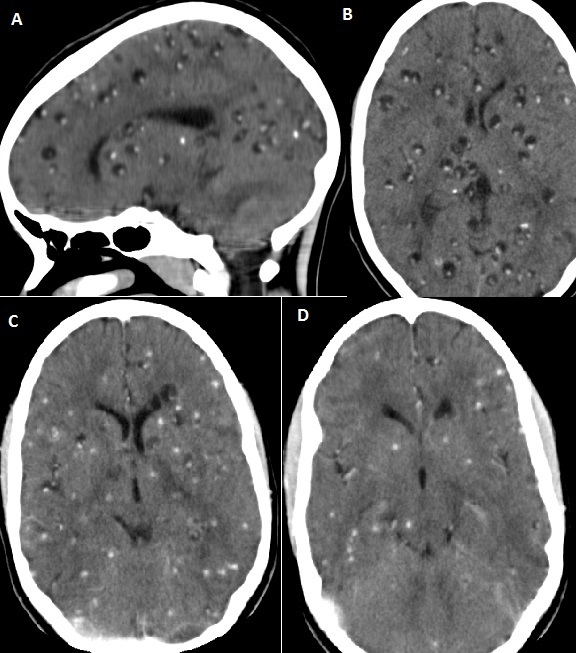
Brain CT of neurocysticercosis before (A and B) and after (C and D) treatment with albendazole

Neurocysticercosis is a persistent infection and symptoms appear months or years later. As a result, removing the parasite is not an emergency, and the first step in treating those with neurocysticercosis is often aimed at minimizing the symptoms. This may be done with the use of antiepileptic, antiedema, analgesic, or anti-inflammatory drugs. Carbamazepine is commonly used to control seizures. Antiepileptic medications may be used till after a year without seizures. Surgery, acetazolamide, steroids, or mannitol may be used to help manage intracranial hypertension.

Steroid administration is an important step in the modulation of neurocysticercosis-related inflammation in the central nervous system, since it controls the acute inflammatory response that occurs following the destruction of live cysts. Prednisolone and dexamethasone are frequently used as adjuncts to antiparasitic therapy.

The two most commonly used antiparasitic medications are albendazole, an imidazole that inhibits glucose absorption and metabolism in the parasite, and praziquantel, an isoquinoline which triggers parasite paralysis by altering calcium pathways and homeostasis. Taking days to months to work, antiparasitic drugs are only appropriate for the treatment of vesicular viable cysts or cysts in the early colloidal phases of development, and are ineffective against calcified cysts. Antiparasitic drugs cannot be given when there is a preexisting risk of developing hydrocephalus, such as with sub-arachnoid neurocysticercosis or encephalitic neurocysticercosis; in these cases, the inflammation that occurs after treatment may pose a significant risk of rapidly raising intracranial pressure and death.

Antiparasitic medication may be ineffective in cases of severe infection due to the hazards associated with mass inflammation, but these forms of neurocysticercosis carry a high risk of consequences if left untreated. In some circumstances, a more aggressive treatment plan, including surgery, may be required. Surgical treatments include ventricle-peritoneal shunts and excision of cysts.

== Outlook ==
The prognosis for neurocysticercosis depends on the number and location of the cysts. Single enhancing lesion neurocysticercosis typically has a good prognosis, with lesions resolving within 6 months in over 60% of cases. Multiple or calcified lesions increase the risk of seizure relapses. Although psychiatric and cognitive changes are common with neurocysticercosis, they are usually not severe enough to affect day-to-day behaviour.

Parenchymal neurocysticercosis has a good prognosis if symptomatic treatment is provided. Parenchymal neurocysticercosis prognosis is mediated by the number of lesions and the severity of the inflammation. Over half of those with calcified parenchymal neurocysticercosis have relapses in seizures and need antiseizure medications long-term.

Extraparenchymal neurocysticercosis does not respond to antiparasitic treatment as well as parenchymal neurocysticercosis, meaning that multiple types or courses of treatment are sometimes needed. Complications from treatment such as shunt blockage or vasculitis are also more prevalent with extraparenchymal neurocysticercosis. Extraparenchymal neurocysticercosis can lead to obstructive hydrocephalus and death.

== Epidemiology ==
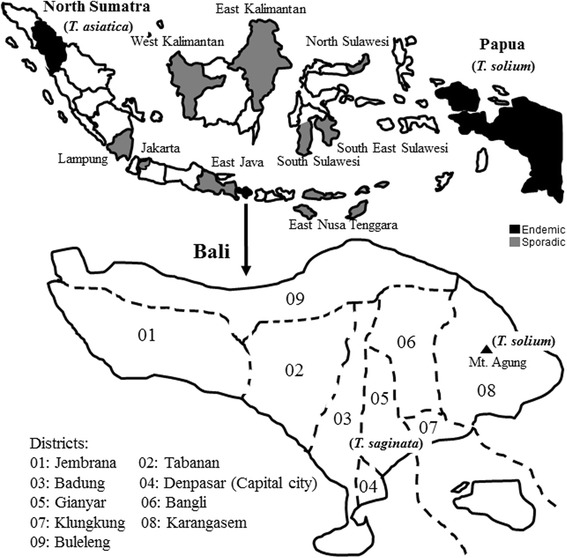
Geographic maps of Indonesia (upper) showing endemic areas of three human Taenia species ( T. asiatica, endemic in North Sumatra; T. saginata and T. solium, endemic in Bali; and T. solium, endemic in Papua) and Bali (lower)

Neurocysticercosis is endemic in most developing countries, except predominantly Muslim countries. It is endemic in Latin America, China, Nepal, Africa, India, and Southeast Asia. It is more common in poorer countries with improper sanitation and a lack of clean water. Taenia solium is considered rare in developed countries and is usually a result of people contracting Taenia solium while travelling or immigration. Reports of neurocysticercosis are growing from several wealthy nations, including the USA and the UK, as a result of increased globalization and worldwide travel. Most cases of neurocysticercosis in the US have been reported in the southwestern states. Around 90% of neurocysticercosis diagnoses in the US were immigrants from Mexico or South America.

Studies conducted in endemic countries have shown that neurocysticercosis is a common cause of increased rates of epilepsy. In endemic regions, CNS infection is extremely common; in many of these groups, the frequency of certain serum antibodies is more than 10%, and residual intraparenchymal brain calcifications on CT scans are seen in 10–20% of the general population. Neurocysticercosis is estimated to affect 29% of those with epilepsy. About 15% of the pig farming community in India has asymptomatic neurocysticercosis. According to a North Indian study, the prevalence of neurocysticercosis in rural India was 4.5 per 1000. Twenty-five percent of individuals with active epilepsy had antibodies against T. solium, based on another study from North India. In an Indian hospital series, neurocysticercosis was responsible for more than half of the instances of children with partial seizures.

== History, society, and culture ==
Descriptions of Taenia solium tapeworms date back to 1500 BC. Taenia solium cysticerci have even been found in ancient Egyptian mummies. The first recorded cases of neurocysticercosis were most likely described by German physician John Wolfgang Rumler in 1558. Hipólito Unanue, a Peruvian physician and journalist, is believed to have first recorded simultaneous taeniasis and cysticercosis in the same individual in 1792: he reported a case involving a soldier with taeniasis who died following a violent seizure. During the 19th century, German pathologists noticed the morphological parallels between the adult T. solium head and the cysticercus scolex. Friedrich Küchenmeister showed that the consumption of cysticercus from pork caused human intestinal taeniasis by feeding a prisoner food that included cysticerci gathered from a recently killed pig. In the second part of the 19th century, research showed that feeding Taenia eggs from infected humans to pigs caused cysticercosis.

Neurocysticercosis was featured in the pilot episode of the TV series House M.D. The episode followed a young woman who contracted neurocysticercosis after eating contaminated ham. Despite the contaminated ham playing an important role in the diagnosis, cysticercosis is not caused by eating infected pork.

== See also ==
- Effects of parasitic worms on the immune system
