= Taeniasis-Cysticercosis =

Taeniasis-Cysticercosis may refer to different presentations of Taenia-tapeworm infection:

- Taeniasis, a general term including asymptomatic cases
- Cysticercosis, caused specifically by the parasiteT. solium
- Neurocysticercosis, caused when the parasite inhabitis the brain
