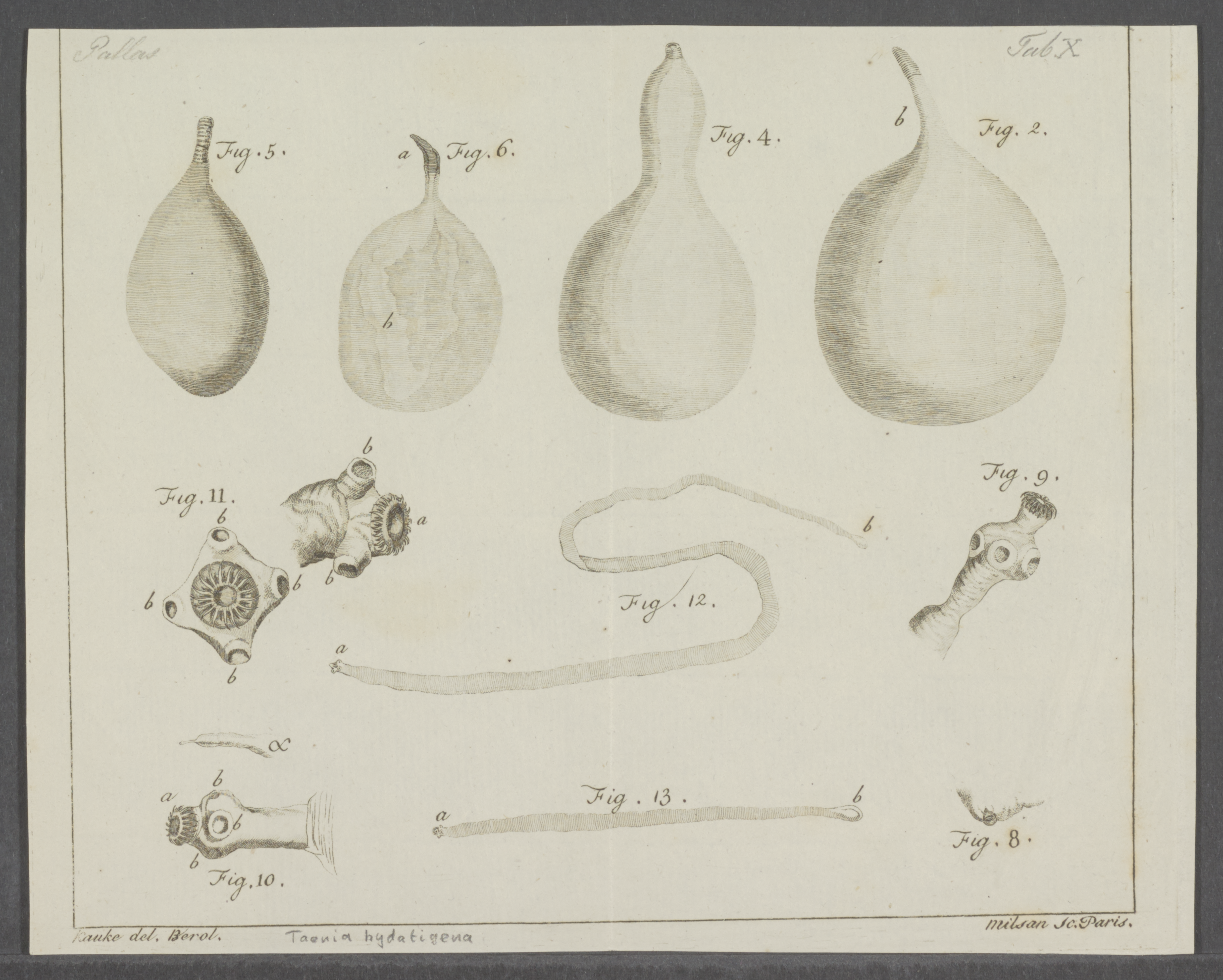
- Height: 16,76 cm. Width: 20,91 cm.

Scientific classification
- Kingdom: Animalia
- Phylum: Platyhelminthes
- Class: Cestoda
- Order: Cyclophyllidea
- Family: Taeniidae
- Genus: Taenia
- Species: T. hydatigena

Binomial name
- Taenia hydatigena Pallas, 1766

= Taenia hydatigena =

Species of flatworm

Taenia hydatigena (thin-necked bladderworm, causative agent of cysticercosis) is one of the adult forms of the canine and feline tapeworm. This infection has a worldwide geographic distribution.

== Transmission ==
Intermediate hosts, which harbor the disease for a short period of time, include: sheep, horses, cattle, pigs, and deer. Definitive hosts, which harbor the parasite until it reaches maturity and during sexual reproduction, include dogs, foxes, and other canids. The cysticercus, the larval form, travels and persists in the liver for 18 – 30 days, then burrows out into the peritoneal cavity and attaches to the viscera. When the sheep viscera is scavenged and the scavenger ingests the cysticercus, the protoscolex attaches to the small intestinal wall and the worm begins to form proglottids. Gravid proglottids, containing the eggs, move from the end of the worm and leave the body in the feces. The prepatent period is about 51 days.

== Symptoms ==
Like any other disease, the symptoms vary from its bodily location and when pertaining to the density of larvae. Many of the major symptoms are the result of inflammation during larval degeneration or a mass effect from the parasite.

== Diagnosis ==
Diagnosis of a T. hydatigena larval infection is based on finding one or several cysticerci in or on the liver or on the mesenteries during postmortem examination. Serpentine markings in the liver tissue may also be indicative of larval migration. T. hydatigena cysticercus identification may be confirmed by the size of the cyst and due to the presence of only one scolex in the bladderworm.

== Prevention ==
The main objectives are as follows: to reduce the chances of an animal becoming infected, and, if infected, to reduce the chances of the infection being transmitted. Preventive programs, such as deworming of the stray dogs from cities and rural regions, could be necessary in this instance, control of wild canids and feral cats, health education and implementing strict regulations of livestock slaughtering and residues disposing in slaughter houses and farms, could reduce the risk of parasite transmission. In addition, it is important for public health authorities, pet owners, physicians and veterinarians in these regions to pay close attention to patients and to remain informed of any possible outbreaks and transmission. In a study conducted at Washington State University, the effects of heat treatment were analyzed on the young forms of Taenia hydatigena. They observed that when the eggs were treated at temperatures of 60 degrees C they did not establish in the hosts. This could be influential in future prevention methods.

== Treatment ==
Cysticercosis can be treated using anthelmintic drugs (i.e. albendazole and praziquantel). Surgery might be required for cysticerci in the eye, cerebral ventricles, and spinal cord. Asymptomatic infections and calcified cysticerci probably will not require treatment. Fecal flotation may reveal eggs if a gravid proglottid has been broken in the feces. After the animal dies, a necropsy is performed to see if cysticerci are found in the abdominal cavity of sheep and goats.
