= Taenia rileyi =

Scientific classification
- Kingdom: Animalia
- Phylum: Platyhelminthes
- Class: Cestoda
- Order: Cyclophyllidea
- Family: Taeniidae
- Genus: Taenia
- Species: T. rileyi

Binomial name
- Taenia rileyi Loewen, 1929

Species of flatworm

Taenia rileyi is a tapeworm of the genus Taenia from the United States. Adults infect bobcats (Lynx rufus) and feral domestic cats (Felis silvestris catus), but larvae have been found in rodents such as the cotton mouse (Peromyscus gossypinus), the marsh rice rat (Oryzomys palustris) in Florida, and the hispid cotton rat (Sigmodon hispidus) in Florida and Georgia. These rodents may serve as intermediate hosts.
