= Taenia mustelae =

Scientific classification
- Kingdom: Animalia
- Phylum: Platyhelminthes
- Class: Cestoda
- Order: Cyclophyllidea
- Family: Taeniidae
- Genus: Taenia
- Species: T. mustelae

Binomial name
- Taenia mustelae Gmelin, 1790

Species of flatworm

Taenia mustelae is a tapeworm of the genus Taenia from the United States. Adults infect carnivorans such as weasels, skunks, and martens, but larvae have been found in rodents such as the Florida mouse (Podomys floridanus) and the marsh rice rat (Oryzomys palustris) in Florida and the hispid cotton rat (Sigmodon hispidus) in Florida and Georgia. These rodents may serve as intermediate hosts.
