= Cysticercosis cutis =

- Specialty: Dermatology

Cysticercosis cutis is a cutaneous condition caused by Taenia solium.

== See also ==
- Skin lesion
