= Acoleidae =

Scientific classification
- Kingdom: Animalia
- Phylum: Platyhelminthes
- Class: Cestoda
- Order: Cyclophyllidea
- Family: Acoleidae

Family of flatworms

Acoleidae is a family of flatworms belonging to the order Cyclophyllidea.

Genera:

- Acoleus Fuhrmann, 1899
- Diplophallus Fuhrmann, 1900
- Himantocestus Ukoli, 1965
