= Friedrich Küchenmeister =

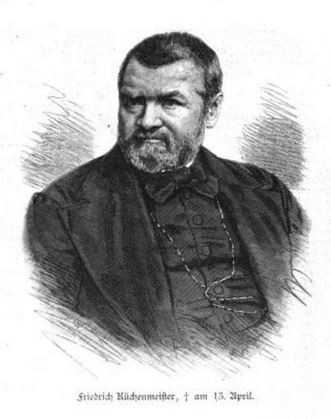
Friedrich Küchenmeister's Portrait

Gottlieb Heinrich Friedrich Küchenmeister (22 January 1821 in Buchheim (now Bad Lausick) – 13 April 1890 in Dresden) was a German physician.

== Life ==
Küchenmeister studied medicine in Leipzig and Prague, and in 1846 he became a general practitioner in Zittau. In 1847 he married, and in 1856 he moved to Dresden. He conducted research on tapeworms, trichinosis, and other parasites and wrote about it several works. He was also publisher of the Allgemeine Zeitschrift für Epidemiologie (General Journal of Epidemiology). In 1852, his theory that bladder-worms are juvenile tapeworms gained the attention of the medical profession. In the later 1850s, he carried out an experiment demonstrating this by feeding pork containing cysticerci of Taenia solium to a prisoner awaiting execution. After the execution, Küchenmeister recovered the developing and adult tapeworms in the prisoner's intestines. By the middle of the 19th century, it was established that cysticercosis was caused by the ingestion of the eggs of T. solium.

Küchenmeister was an advocate of cremation, as he saw the risk of soil contamination in the putrefaction and decomposition products that occur after burial. In Dresden, he founded the group The Urn: Association for Facultative Cremation. In 1876, he took part in the first European Congress of the Friends of Cremation, also in Dresden.
