= Taeniasis =

Parasitic disease due to infection with tapeworms belonging to the genus Taenia

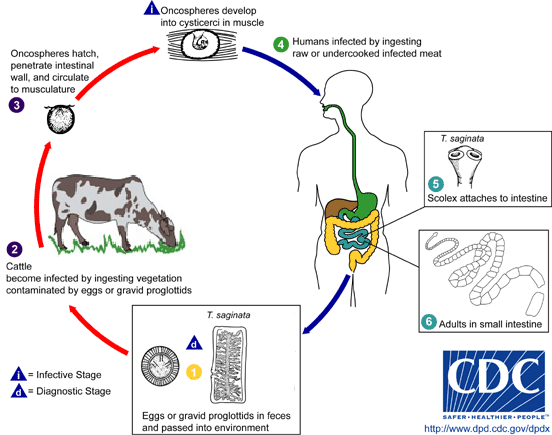
- The life cycle of Taenia saginata, the beef tapeworm
- Specialty: Infectious disease
- Symptoms: None, weight loss, abdominal pain
- Complications: Pork tapeworm: cysticercosis
- Types: Taenia solium (pork tapeworm), Taenia saginata (beef tapeworm), Taenia asiatica (Asian tapeworm)
- Causes: Infection with adult tapeworms
- Risk factors: Eating contaminated undercooked pork or beef
- Diagnostic method: Examination of stool samples
- Prevention: Properly cooking meat
- Treatment: Praziquantel, niclosamide
- Frequency: 50 million (with cysticercosis)

Taeniasis is an infection within the intestines by adult tapeworms belonging to the genus Taenia. There are generally no or only mild symptoms. Symptoms may occasionally include weight loss or abdominal pain. Segments of tapeworm may be seen in the stool. Complications of pork tapeworm may include cysticercosis.

Types of Taenia that cause infections in humans include Taenia solium (pork tapeworm), Taenia saginata (beef tapeworm), and Taenia asiatica (Asian tapeworm). Taenia saginata is due to eating contaminated undercooked beef while Taenia solium and Taenia asiatica is from contaminated undercooked pork. Diagnosis is by examination of stool samples.

Prevention is by properly cooking meat. Treatment is generally with praziquantel, though niclosamide may also be used. Together with cysticercosis, infections affect about 50 million people globally. The disease is most common in the developing world. In the United States fewer than 1,000 cases occur annually.

== Signs and symptoms ==
Taeniasis generally has few or no symptoms. It takes about 8 weeks from infection for adult worms to form and can last for years without treatment.

Infection may be suspected when a portion of the worm is passed in the stool. It is not generally fatal.

=== Pork tapeworm ===
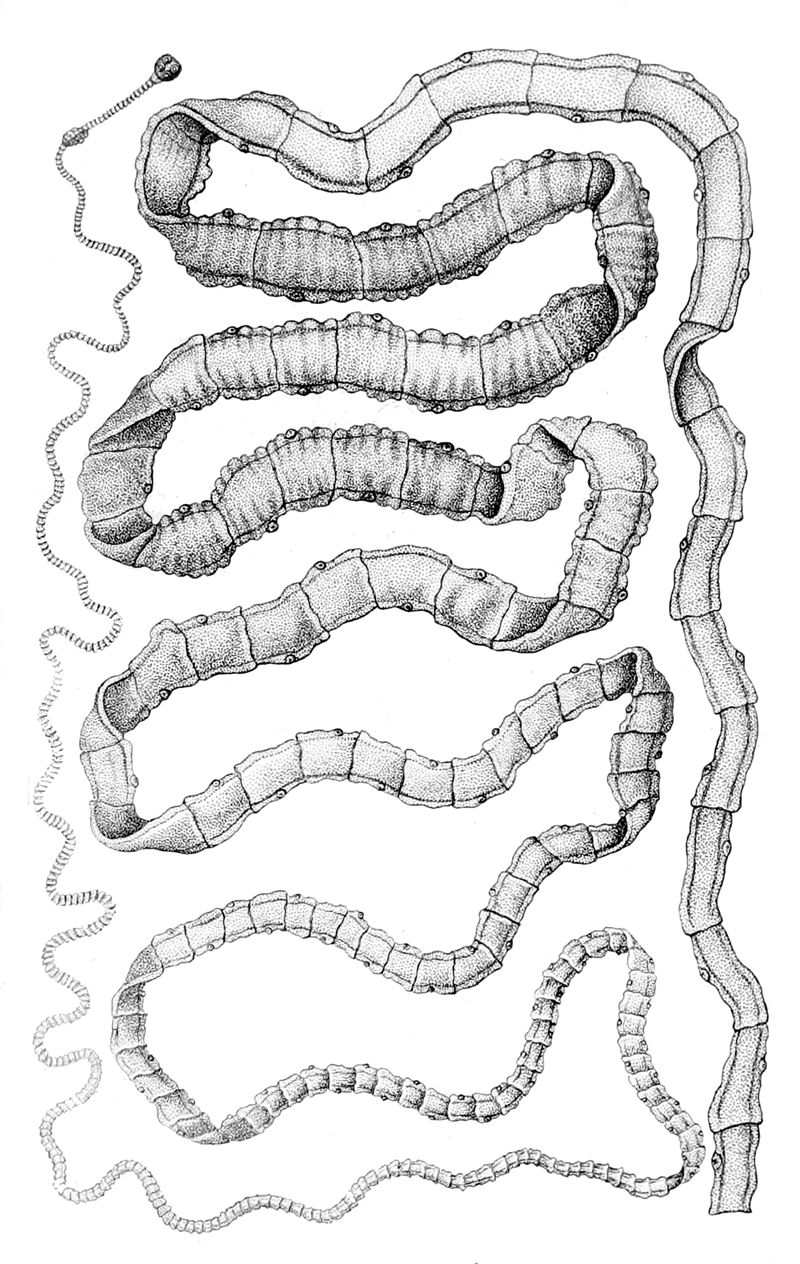
Taenia solium adult

Infection in the intestines by the adult T. solium worms is normally asymptomatic. Heavy infection can result in anaemia and indigestion.

A complication, known as cysticercosis, may occur if the eggs of the pork tapeworm are eaten. This typically occurs from vegetables or water contaminated by feces from someone with pork tapeworm taeniasis. The eggs enter the intestine where they develop into larvae which then enter the bloodstream and invade host tissues. This is the most frequent and severe disease caused by any tapeworm. It can lead to headaches, dizziness, seizures, dementia, hypertension, lesions in the brain, blindness, tumor-like growths, and low eosinophil levels. It is a cause of major neurological problems, such as hydrocephalus, paraplegy, meningitis, and death.

=== Beef tapeworm ===
Taenia saginata infection is usually asymptomatic, but heavy infection causes weight loss, dizziness, abdominal pain, diarrhea, headaches, nausea, constipation, chronic indigestion, and loss of appetite. It can cause antigen reaction that induce allergic reaction. It is also a rare cause of ileus, pancreatitis, cholecystitis, and cholangitis.

=== Asian tapeworm ===
Taenia asiatica is also usually asymptomatic. It is unclear if T. asiatica can cause cysticercosis. In pigs, the cysticercus can produce cysticercosis. Cysts develop in liver and lungs. (T. saginata does not cause cysticercosis.)

== Transmission ==
Taeniasis is contracted after eating undercooked pork or beef that contains the larvae. The adult worms develop and live in the lumen of the intestine. They acquire nutrients from the intestine. The gravid proglottids, body segments containing fertilised eggs, are released in the faeces.

If consumed by an intermediate host such as a cow or pig, they hatch within the duodenum to become larvae, penetrate through the intestinal wall into nearby blood vessels, and enter the bloodstream. Once they reach organs such as the skeletal muscles, liver, or lungs, the larvae then develop into a cyst, a fluid-filled cysticercus. These contaminated tissues are then consumed through raw or undercooked meat.

Cysticercosis occurs when contaminated food, water, or soil that contains T. solium eggs is eaten.

== Diagnosis ==
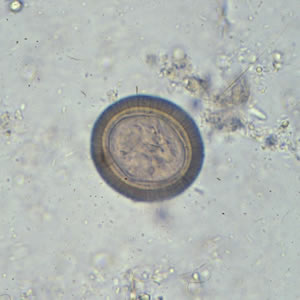
Egg of T. solium

Diagnosis of taeniasis is mainly using stool sample, particularly by identifying the eggs. However, this has limitations at the species level because tapeworms have similar eggs. Examination of the scolex or the gravid proglottids can resolve the exact species. But body segments are not often available, therefore, laborious histological observation of the uterine branches and PCR detection of ribosomal 5.8S gene are sometimes necessary. Ziehl–Neelsen stain is also used for T. saginata and T. solium, in most cases only the former will stain, but the method is not entirely reliable. Loop-mediated isothermal amplification (LAMP) is highly sensitive (~2.5 times that of multiplex PCR), without false positives, for differentiating the taenid species from faecal samples.

To date the most relevant test for T. asiatica is by enzyme-linked immunoelectrotransfer blot (EITB). EITB can effectively identify asiatica from other taenid infections since the serological test indicates an immunoblot band of 21.5 kDa exhibited specifically by T. asiatica. Even though it gives 100% sensitivity, it has not been tested with human sera for cross-reactivity, and it may show a high false positive result.

== Prevention ==
Prevention efforts include properly cooking meat, treating active cases in humans, vaccinating and treating pigs against the disease, stricter meat-inspection standards, health education, improved sanitation, and improved pig-raising practices.

Preventing human faeces from contaminating pig feeds also plays a role. Infection can be prevented with proper disposal of human faeces around pigs, cooking meat thoroughly and/or freezing the meat at −10 °C for 5 days. Contaminated hands are the primary method of transmission for human cysticercosis, especially in populations like food handlers.

Proper cooking of meat is an effective prevention. For example, cooking (56 °C for 5 minutes) of beef viscera destroys cysticerci. Refrigeration, freezing (−10 °C for 9 days) or long periods of salting is also lethal to cysticerci.

== Treatment ==
Praziquantel is the treatment of choice. Usual treatments are with praziquantel (5–10 mg/kg, single-administration) or niclosamide (adults and children over 6 years: 2 g, single-administration after a light breakfast, followed after 2 hours by a laxative; children aged 2–6 years: 1 g; children under 2 years: 500 mg). One study showed albendazole is effective against animal beef tapeworm cysticercosis. Mepacrine is quite effective but has adverse effects in humans.

== Epidemiology ==
The total global infection is estimated to be between 40 and 60 million people. In the US, the incidence of infection is low, but 25% of cattle sold are still infected.

=== Regions ===
Taeniasis is predominantly found in Asia, Africa, and Latin America, particularly on farms in which pigs are exposed to human excrement. At a low level though, it occurs everywhere where beef and pork are eaten, even in countries with strict sanitation policies such as the United States. Taenia saginata is relatively common in Africa, some parts of Eastern Europe, the Philippines, and Latin America. It is most prevalent in Sub-Saharan Africa and the Middle East. Taenia asiatica is restricted to East Asia, including Taiwan, Korea, Indonesia, Nepal, Thailand and China.

== See also ==
- Tapeworm infection
