= Niclosamide =

Chemical compound

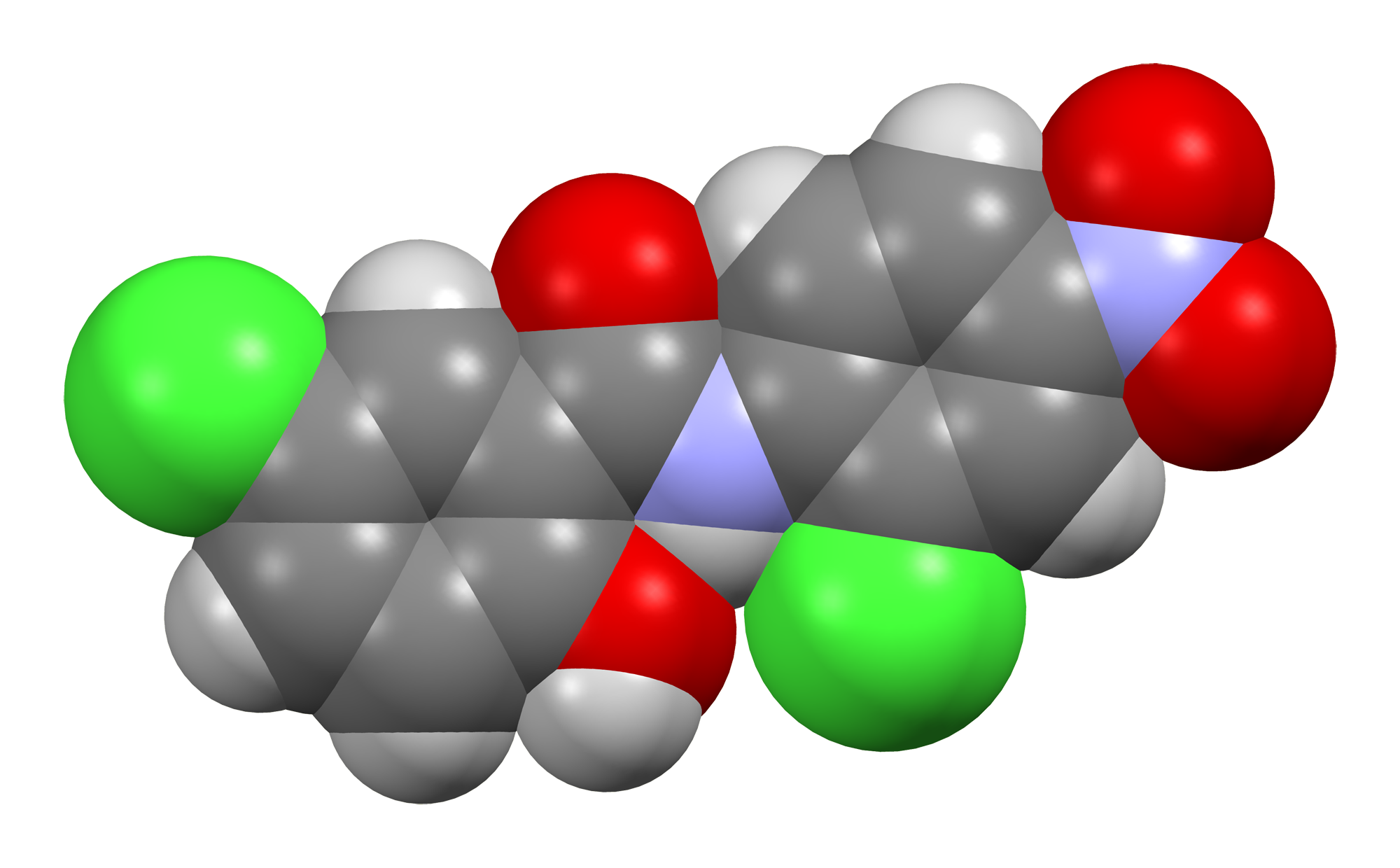

Clinical data
- Trade names: Niclocide, Fenasal, Phenasal, others
- AHFS/Drugs.com: Micromedex Detailed Consumer Information
- Routes of administration: By mouth
- ATC code: P02DA01 (WHO) QP52AG03 (WHO)

Identifiers
- IUPAC name: 5-Chloro-N-(2-chloro-4-nitrophenyl)-2-hydroxybenzamide
- CAS Number: 50-65-7
- PubChem CID: 4477
- DrugBank: DB06803
- ChemSpider: 4322
- UNII: 8KK8CQ2K8G
- KEGG: D00436
- ChEBI: CHEBI:7553
- ChEMBL: ChEMBL1448
- CompTox Dashboard (EPA): DTXSID7040362
- ECHA InfoCard: 100.000.052

Chemical and physical data
- Formula: C_{13}H_{8}Cl_{2}N_{2}O_{4}
- Molar mass: 327.12 g·mol^{−1}
- 3D model (JSmol): Interactive image
- Melting point: 225 to 230 °C (437 to 446 °F)
- SMILES: Clc2cc(ccc2NC(=O)c1cc(Cl)ccc1O)[N+]([O-])=O
- InChI: InChI=1S/C13H8Cl2N2O4/c14-7-1-4-12(18)9(5-7)13(19)16-11-3-2-8(17(20)21)6-10(11)15/h1-6,18H,(H,16,19); Key:RJMUSRYZPJIFPJ-UHFFFAOYSA-N

Niclosamide, sold under the brand name Niclocide among others, is an anthelmintic medication used to treat tapeworm infestations, including diphyllobothriasis, hymenolepiasis, and taeniasis. It is not effective against other worms such as flukes or roundworms. It is taken by mouth.

Side effects include nausea, vomiting, abdominal pain, and itchiness. It may be used during pregnancy. It works by blocking glucose uptake and oxidative phosphorylation by the worm.

Niclosamide was first synthesized in 1958. It is on the World Health Organization's List of Essential Medicines. Niclosamide is not available for human use in the United States.

== Side effects ==
Side effects include nausea, vomiting, abdominal pain, constipation, and itchiness. Rarely, dizziness, skin rash, drowsiness, perianal itching, or an unpleasant taste occur. For some of these reasons, praziquantel is a preferable and equally effective treatment for tapeworm infestation.

Of note, niclosamide kills the pork tapeworm in a way that causes a multitude of viable eggs to be released and may result in cysticercosis. Neurocysticercosis is a life-threatening condition that may require brain surgery.

== Mechanism of action ==
Niclosamide inhibits glucose uptake, oxidative phosphorylation, and anaerobic metabolism in the tapeworm. It is a protonophore or proton shunt, disrupting proton gradients across membranes.

== Use as a pesticide ==
Niclosamide's metabolic effects are relevant to a wide ranges of organisms, and accordingly it has been applied as a control measure to organisms other than tapeworms. For example, it is an active ingredient in some formulations, such as Bayluscide, for killing lamprey larvae, as a molluscide, and as a general-purpose piscicide in aquaculture. Niclosamide has a short half-life in water in field conditions; this makes it valuable in ridding commercial fish ponds of unwanted fish; it loses bioactivity soon enough to permit restocking within a few days of eradicating the previous populations. Researchers have found that niclosamide is effective in killing invasive zebra mussels in cool freshwater aquatic environments.

== Medical research ==
Niclosamide is under investigation as a potential treatment for certain types of cancer, bacterial infections, and viral infections. It has been reported to localize to acidic cellular compartments, including tumor microenvironment and intracellular vesicles involved in viral replication.

In 2018, niclosamide was observed to be a potent activator of PTEN-induced kinase 1 in primary cortical neurons.

It shows in-vitro antifungal effects against some forms of eumycetoma.
