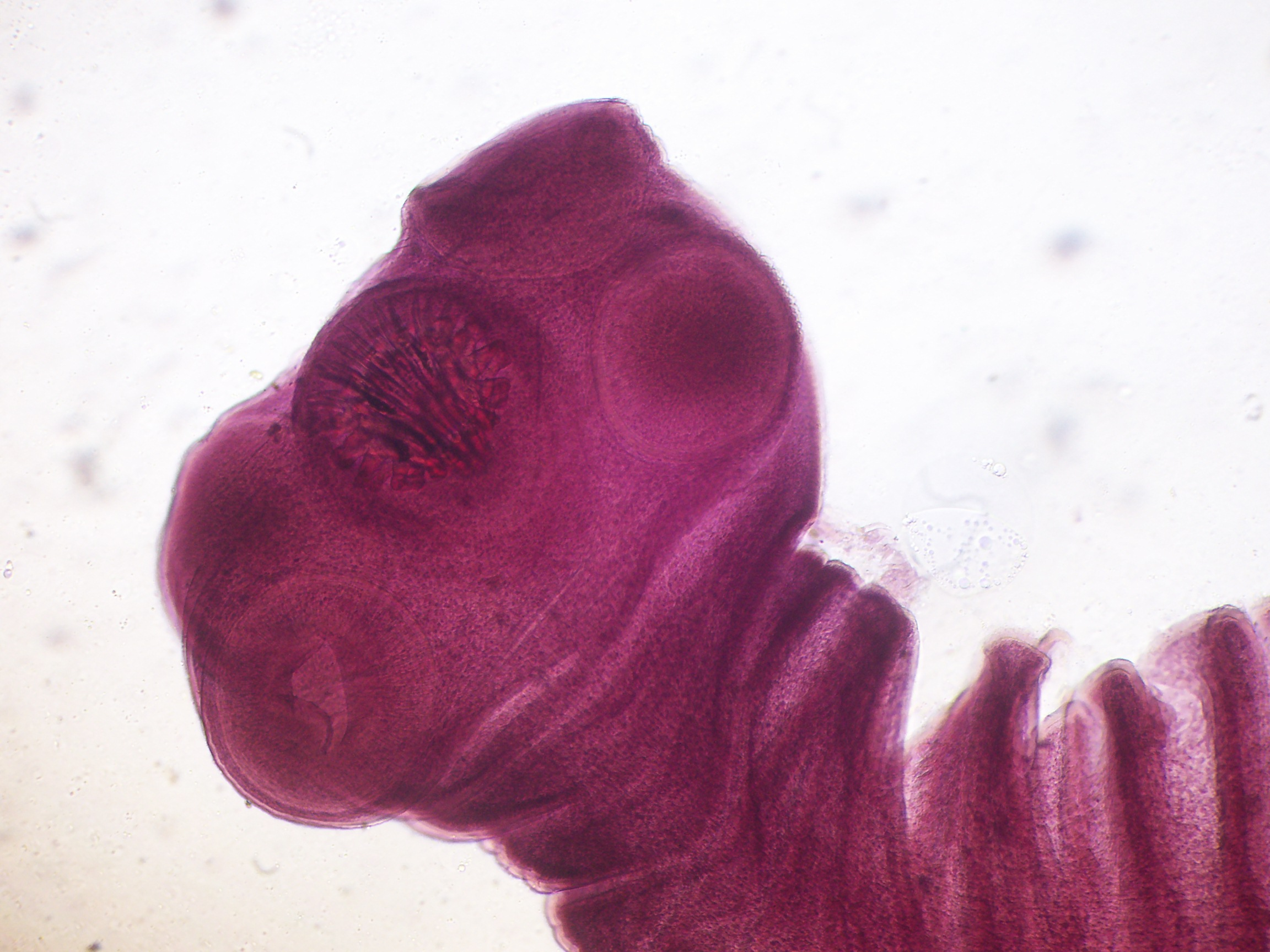
- Scolex (head) of Taenia solium

Scientific classification
- Kingdom: Animalia
- Phylum: Platyhelminthes
- Class: Cestoda
- Order: Cyclophyllidea
- Family: Taeniidae
- Genus: Taenia
- Species: T. solium

Binomial name
- Taenia solium Linnaeus, 1758

= Taenia solium =

Species of tapeworm

Taenia solium, the pork tapeworm, belongs to the cyclophyllid cestode family Taeniidae. It is found throughout the world and is most common in countries where pork is eaten. It is a tapeworm that uses humans (Homo sapiens) as its definitive host and pigs and boars (family Suidae) as the intermediate or secondary hosts. It is transmitted to pigs through human feces that contain the parasite eggs and contaminate their fodder. Pigs ingest the eggs, which develop into larvae, then into oncospheres, and ultimately into infective tapeworm cysts, called cysticerci. Humans acquire the cysts through consumption of uncooked or undercooked pork and the cysts grow into adult worms in the small intestine.

There are two forms of human infection. One is "primary hosting", called taeniasis, and is due to eating undercooked pork that contains the cysts, resulting in adult worms in the intestines. This form generally is without symptoms; the infected person does not know they have tapeworms. This form is easily treated with anthelmintic medications which eliminate the tapeworm. The other form, "secondary hosting", called cysticercosis, is due to eating food, or drinking water, contaminated with faeces from someone infected by the adult worms, thus ingesting the tapeworm eggs, instead of the cysts. The eggs go on to develop cysts primarily in the muscles, and usually with no symptoms. However, some people have obvious symptoms, the most harmful and chronic form of which is when the cysts form in the brain. Treatment of this form is more difficult but possible.

The adult worm has a flat, ribbon-like body which is white and measures 2 to 3 metres (6.6 to 9.8 ft) long, or more. Its tiny attachment, the scolex, contains suckers and a rostellum as organs of attachment that attach to the wall of the small intestine. The main body, consists of a chain of segments known as proglottids. Each proglottid is little more than a self-sustainable, very lightly ingestive, self-contained reproductive unit since tapeworms are hermaphrodites.

Human primary hosting is best diagnosed by microscopy of eggs in faeces, often triggered by spotting shed segments. In secondary hosting, imaging techniques such as computed tomography and nuclear magnetic resonance are often employed. Blood samples can also be tested using antibody reaction of enzyme-linked immunosorbent assay.

T. solium deeply affects developing countries, especially in rural settings where pigs roam free, as clinical manifestations are highly dependent on the number, size, and location of the parasites as well as the host's immune and inflammatory response.

== Description ==
Adult T. solium is a triploblastic acoelomate, having no body cavity. It is normally 2 to 3 metres (6.6 to 9.8 ft) in length, but can become much larger, sometimes over 8 metres (26 ft) long. It is white in colour and flattened into a ribbon-like body. The anterior end is a knob-like attachment organ (sometimes mistakenly referred to as a "head") called a scolex, 1 mm in diameter. The scolex bears four radially arranged suckers that surround the rostellum. These are the organs of adhesive attachment to the intestinal wall of the host. The rostellum is armed with two rows of proteinaceous spiny hooks. Its 22 to 32 rostellar hooks can be differentiated into short (130 μm) and long (180 μm) types.

After a short neck is the elongated body, the strobila. The entire body is covered by a covering called a tegument, which is an absorptive layer consisting of a mat of minute specialised microvilli called microtriches. The strobila is divided into segments called proglottids, 800 to 900 in number. Body growth starts from the neck region, so the oldest proglottids are at the posterior end. Thus, the three distinct proglottids are immature proglottids towards the neck, mature proglottids in the middle, and gravid proglottids at the posterior end. A hermaphroditic species, each mature proglottid contains a set of male and female reproductive systems with numerous testes and an ovary with three lobes. The uterus is branched with a characteristic 7 to 13 branches per side. The cirrus, a sex organ at the terminus of the vas deferens, and vagina open into a common genital pore or atrium. The oldest gravid proglottids are full of fertilised eggs, Each fertilised egg is spherical and measures 35 to 42 μm in diameter.

If released early enough in the digestive tract and not passed, fertilised eggs can mature using upper tract digestive enzymes. The tiny oncosphere larvae, activated by exposure to host enzymes and bile salts, penetrate the intestinal wall and migrate in the blood stream or lymphatics to reach sites where they can develop into cysticerci. These have three morphologically distinct types. The common one is the ordinary "cellulose" cysticercus, which has a fluid-filled bladder 0.5 to 1.5 cm (1/4 to 1/2 in) in length and an invaginated scolex. The intermediate form has a scolex. The "racemose" has no evident scolex, but is believed to be larger. They can be 20 cm (7.9 in) in length and have 60 ml (2 fl. oz.) of fluid, and 13% of patients with neurocysticercosis can have all three types in the brain.

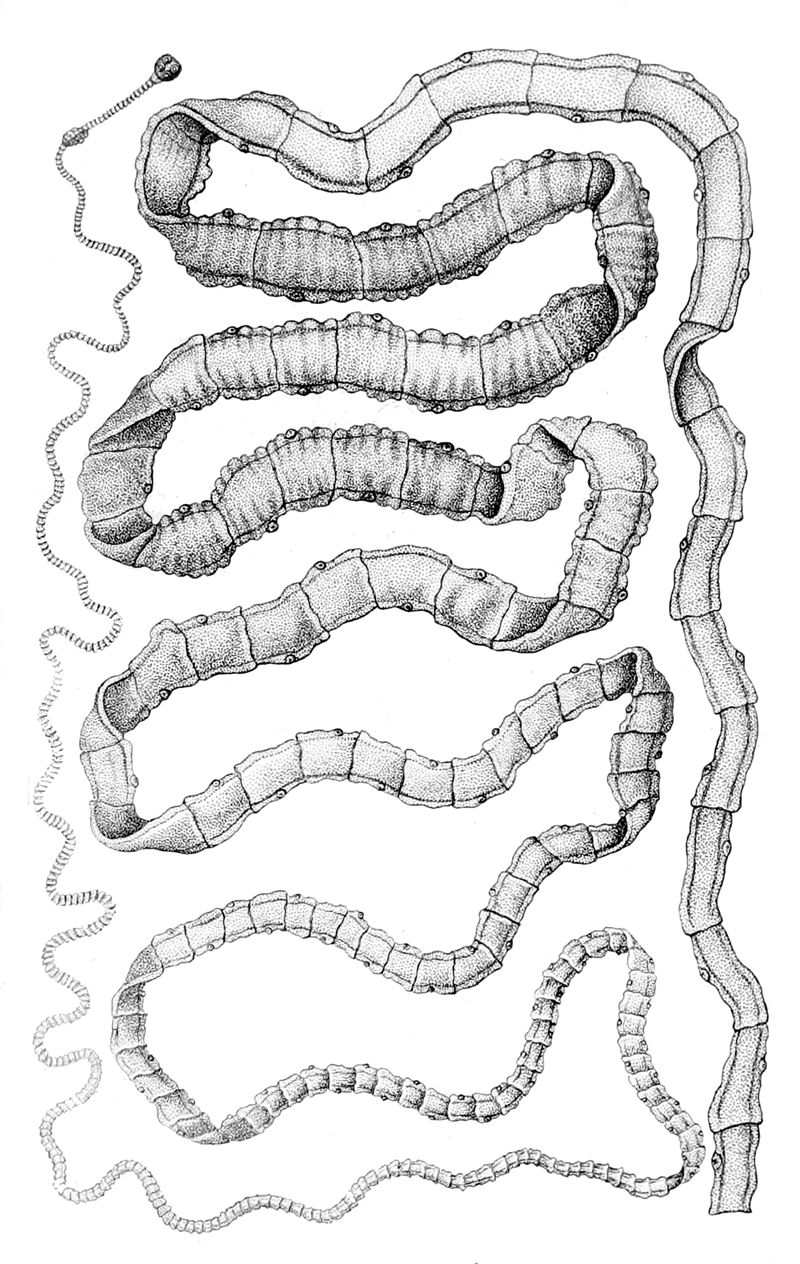
Taenia solium adult

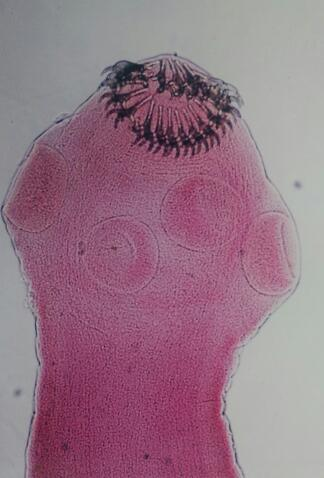
Taenia solium scolex (x400)

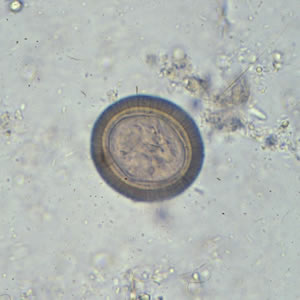
Egg of T. solium

== Life cycle ==
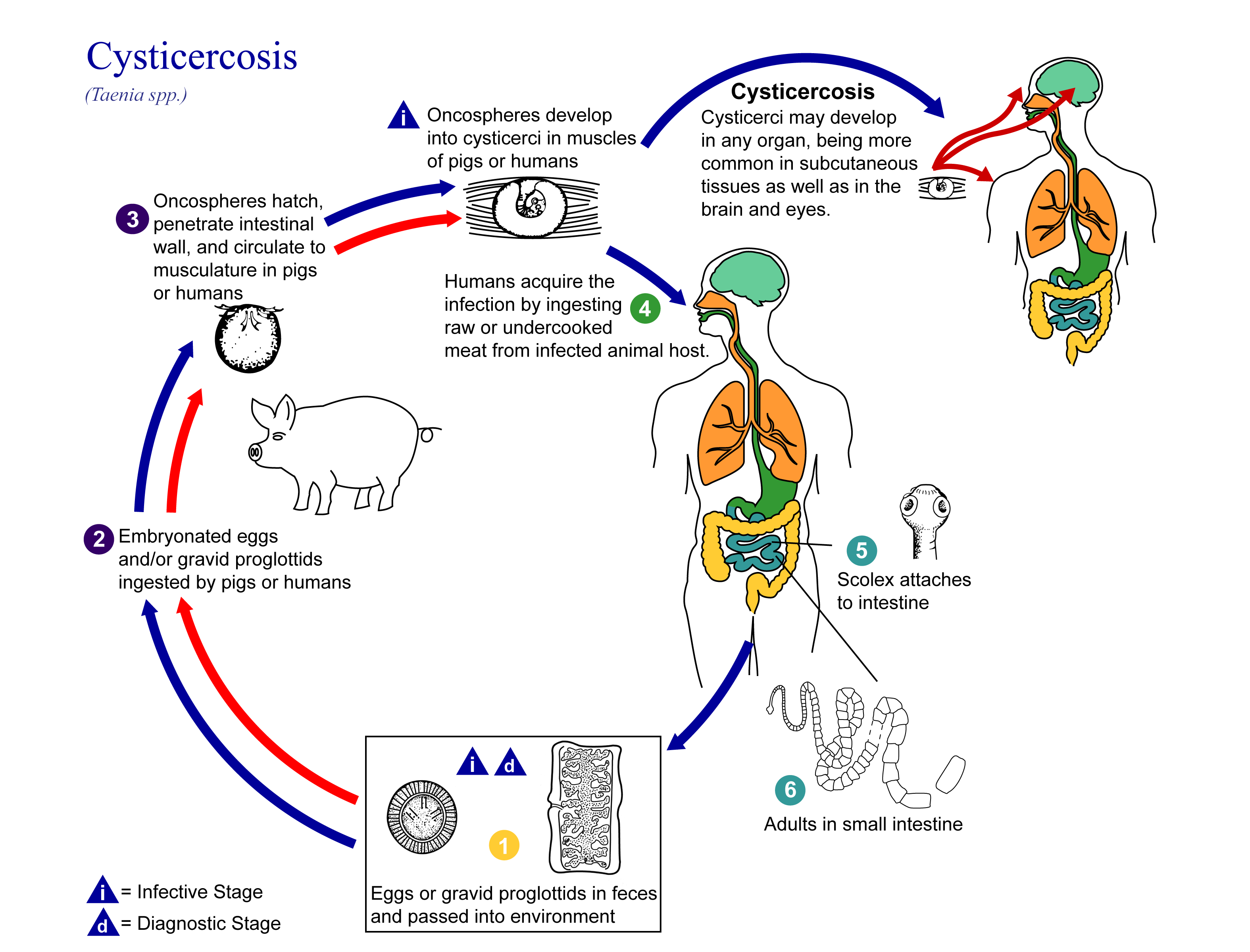
Lifecycle of T. solium. Red arrows indicate pig; blue arrows human.

The life cycle of T. solium is indirect as it passes through pigs and boars, commonly Sus domesticus due to their association with people, as intermediate hosts, into humans, as definitive hosts. In humans the infection can be relatively short or long lasting, and in the latter case if reaching the brain can last for life. From humans, the eggs are released in the environment where they await ingestion by another host. In the secondary host, the eggs develop into oncospheres which bore through the intestinal wall and migrate to other parts of the body where the cysticerci form. The cysticerci can survive for several years in the animal.

=== Definitive host ===
Humans are colonised by the larval stage, the cysticercus, from undercooked pork or other meat. Each microscopic cysticercus is oval in shape, containing an inverted scolex (specifically "protoscolex"), which everts once the organism is inside the small intestine. This process of evagination is stimulated by bile juice and digestive enzymes (of the host). Then, the protoscolex lodges in the host's upper intestine by using its crowned hooks and four suckers to enter the intestinal mucosa. Then, the scolex is fixed into the intestine by having the suckers attached to the villi and hooks extended. It grows in size using nutrients from the surroundings. Its strobila lengthens as new proglottids are formed at the foot of the neck. In 10–12 weeks after initial colonisation, it is an adult worm. The exact life span of an adult worm is not determined; however, evidences from an outbreak among British military in the 1930s indicate that they can survive for 2 to 5 years in humans.

As a hermaphrodite, it reproduces by self-fertilisation, or cross-fertilisation if gametes are exchanged between two different proglottids. Spermatozoa fuse with the ova in the fertilisation duct, where the zygotes are produced. The zygote undergoes holoblastic and unequal cleavage resulting in three cell types, small, medium and large (micromeres, mesomeres, megameres). Megameres develop into a syncytial layer, the outer embryonic membrane; mesomeres into the radially striated inner embryonic membrane or embryophore; micromeres become the morula. The morula transforms into a six-hooked embryo known as an oncosphere, or hexacanth ("six hooked") larva. A gravid proglottid can contain more than 50,000 embryonated eggs. Gravid proglottids often rupture in the intestine, liberating the oncospheres in faeces. Intact gravid proglottids are shed off in groups of four or five. The free eggs and detached proglottids are spread through the host's defecation (peristalsis). Oncospheres can survive in the environment for up to two months.

=== Intermediate host ===
Pigs are the principal intermediate hosts that ingest the eggs in traces of human faeces, mainly from vegetation contaminated with it such as from water bearing traces of it. The embryonated eggs enter intestine where they hatch into motile oncospheres. The embryonic and basement membranes are removed by the host's digestive enzymes (particularly pepsin). Then the free oncospheres attach on the intestinal wall using their hooks. With the help of digestive enzymes from the penetration glands, they penetrate the intestinal mucosa to enter blood and lymphatic vessels. They move along the general circulatory system to various organs, and large numbers are cleared in the liver. The surviving oncospheres preferentially migrate to striated muscles, as well as the brain, liver, and other tissues, where they settle to form cysts — cysticerci. A single cysticercus is spherical, measuring 1–2 cm (about ½") in diameter, and contains an invaginated protoscolex. The central space is filled with fluid like a bladder, hence it is also called bladder worm. Cysticerci are usually formed within 70 days and may continue to grow for a year.

Humans are also accidental secondary hosts when they are colonised by embryonated eggs, either by auto-colonisation or ingestion of contaminated food. As in pigs, the oncospheres hatch and enter blood circulation. When they settle to form cysts, clinical symptoms of cysticercosis appear. The cysticercus is often called the metacestode.

== Diseases ==
=== Signs and symptoms ===
==== Taeniasis ====
Taeniasis is infection in the intestines by the adult T. solium. It generally has mild or non-specific symptoms. This may include abdominal pain, nausea, diarrhoea and constipation. Such symptoms will arise when the tapeworm has fully developed in the intestine, this would be around eight weeks after the contraction (ingestion of meat containing cysticerci).

These symptoms could continue until the tapeworm dies from the course of treatment but otherwise could continue for many years, as long as the worm lives. If untreated it is common that the infections with T. solium last for approximately 2–3 years. It is possible that infected people may show no symptoms for years.

==== Cysticercosis ====
Ingestion of T. solium eggs or egg-containing proglottids which rupture within the host intestines results in the development and subsequent migration of larvae into host tissue to cause cysticercosis. In pigs, there are not normally pathological lesions as they easily develop immunity. But in humans, infection with the eggs causes serious medical conditions. This is because T. solium cysticerci have a predilection for the brain. In symptomatic cases, a wide spectrum of symptoms may be expressed, including headaches, dizziness, and seizures. Brain infection by the cysticerci is called neurocysticercosis and is the leading cause of seizures worldwide.

In more severe cases, dementia or hypertension can occur due to perturbation of the normal circulation of cerebrospinal fluid. (Any increase in intracranial pressure will result in a corresponding increase in arterial blood pressure, as the body seeks to maintain circulation to the brain.) The severity of cysticercosis depends on location, size and number of parasite larvae in tissues, as well as the host immune response. Other symptoms include sensory deficits, involuntary movements, and brain system dysfunction. In children, ocular cysts are more common than in other parts of the body.

In many cases, cysticercosis in the brain can lead to epilepsy, seizures, lesions in the brain, blindness, tumour-like growths, and low eosinophil levels. It is the cause of major neurological problems, such as hydrocephalus, paraplegy, meningitis, convulsions, and even death.

=== Diagnosis ===
Stool tests commonly include microbiology testing – the microscopic examination of stools after concentration aims to determine the amount of eggs. Specificity is extremely high for someone with training but sensitivity is quite low because the high variation in the number of eggs in small amounts of sample.

Stool tapeworm antigen detection: Using ELISA increases the sensitivity of the diagnosis. The downside of this tool is it has high costs, an ELISA reader and reagents are required and trained operators are needed. In 2009, researchers developed the first species-specific test based on antigens found in human stool shed by adult Taenia solium. A 2020 study in Ag-ELISA test on T. solium cysticercosis in infected pigs and showed 82.7% sensitivity and 86.3% specificity. The study concluded that the test is more reliable in ruling out T. solium cysticercosis versus confirmation.

Stool PCR: This method can provide a species-specific diagnosis when proglottid material is taken from the stool. This method requires specific facilities, equipment and trained individuals to run the tests. This method has not yet been tested in controlled field trials.

Serum antibody tests: using immunoblot and ELISA, tape-worm specific circulating antibodies have been detected. The assays for these tests have both a high sensitivity and specificity. A 2018 study of two commercially available kits showed low sensitivity with patients diagnose with NCC (neurocysticercosis) especially with calcified NCC versus patients with cystic hydatid disease. Current standard for serologic diagnosis of NCC is the lentil lectin-bound glycoproteins/enzyme-linked immunoelectrotransfer blot (LLGP-EITB).

Guidelines for diagnosis and treatment remain difficult for endemic countries, most of them developing with limited resources. Many developing countries diagnosed clinically with imaging.

=== Prevention ===
The best way to avoid getting tapeworms is to not eat undercooked pork or vegetables contaminated with faeces. Moreover, a high level of sanitation and prevention of faecal contamination of pig feeds also plays a major role in prevention. Infection can be prevented with proper disposal of human faeces around pigs, cooking meat thoroughly or freezing the meat at −10 °C (14 °F) for 5 days. For human cysticercosis, dirty hands are attributed to be the primary cause, and especially common among food handlers.

Mass drug administration (MDA) of anthelmintics have been suggested to eradicate T. solium infection in endemic populations. Therapies primarily include praziquantel or niclosamide. There are some concerns over praziquantel administration and serious neurological effects in individuals with neurocysticercosis. A 2025 study attempted to reduce those effects by screening for individuals with neurocysticercosis and treating them with niclosamide instead. Of participants who were treated with praziquantel, 10 experienced serious adverse effects. No participants given niclosamide experienced serious adverse effects.

=== Treatment ===
Treatment of cysticercosis must be carefully monitored for inflammatory reactions to the dying worms, especially if they are located in the brain. Albendazole is commonly given (along with glucocorticoids to reduce the inflammation). In selected cases, surgery may be required to remove the cysts.

In neurocysticercosis, most patients under cysticidal therapy will have significant improvement in seizure control. A combination of praziquantel and albendazole is more effective in treating neurocystercosis. A 2014 double blind randomized control study showed increased parasiticidal effect with albendazole plus praziquantel.

A vaccine to prevent cysticercosis in pigs has been studied. The life-cycle of the parasite can be terminated in their intermediate host, pigs, thereby preventing further human infection. The large scale use of this vaccine, however, is still under consideration.

During the 1940s, the preferred treatment was oleoresin of aspidium, which would be introduced into the duodenum via a Rehfuss tube.

=== Epidemiology ===
T. solium is found worldwide, but its two distinctive forms rely on eating undercooked pork or on ingesting faeces-contaminated water or food (respectively). Because pig meat is the intermediate source of the intestinal parasite, rotation of the full life cycle occurs in regions where humans live in close contact with pigs and eat undercooked pork. However, humans can also act as secondary hosts, which is a more pathological, harmful stage triggered by oral contamination. High prevalences are reported among many places with poorer than average water hygiene or even mildly contaminated water especially with a pork-eating heritage such as Latin America, West Africa, Russia, India, Manchuria, and Southeast Asia. In Europe it is most common in pockets of Slavic countries and among global travelers taking inadequate precautions in eating pork especially.

The secondary host form, human cysticercosis, predominates in areas where poor hygiene allows for mild fecal contamination of food, soil, or water supplies. Rates in the United States have shown immigrants from Mexico, Central and South America, and Southeast Asia bear the brunt of cases of cysticercosis caused by the ingestion of microscopic, long-lasting and hardy tapeworm eggs. For example, in 1990 and 1991 four unrelated members of an Orthodox Jewish community in New York City developed recurrent seizures and brain lesions, which were found to have been caused by T. solium. All had housekeepers from Mexico, some of whom were suspected to be the source of the infections. Rates of T. solium cysticercosis in West Africa are not affected by any religion.

Neurocystiscercosis is noted at around one-third of all epilepsy cases in many developing countries. Neurological morbidity and mortality remain high in lower-income countries and high amongst developed countries with high rates of migration. Global prevalence rates remain largely unknown as screening tools, immunological, molecular tests, and neuroimaging are not usually available in many endemic areas.

== See also ==
- List of parasites of humans
