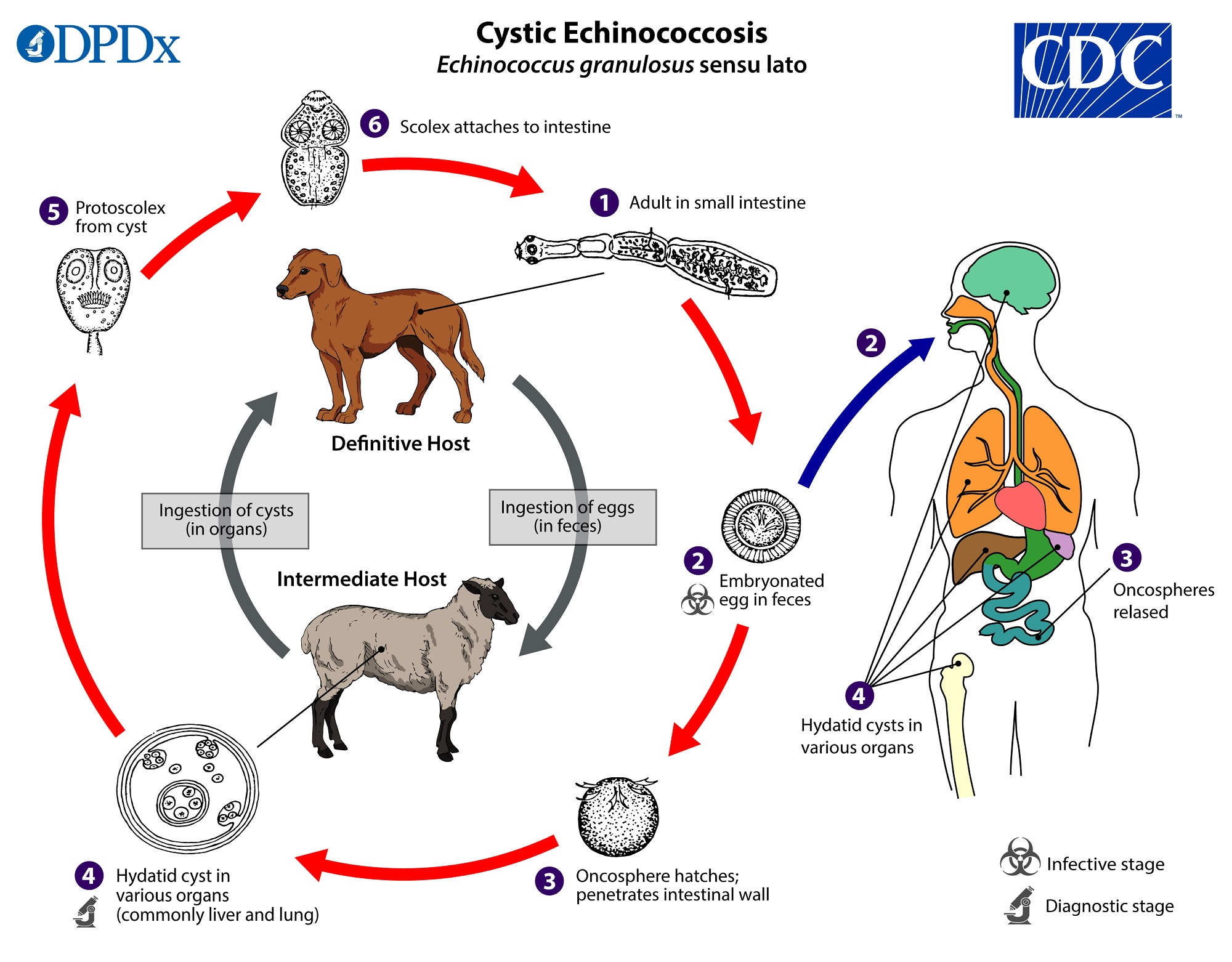
- Life cycle of Echinococcus granulosus

Scientific classification
- Kingdom: Animalia
- Phylum: Platyhelminthes
- Class: Cestoda
- Order: Cyclophyllidea
- Family: Taeniidae; Ludwig, 1886

= Taeniidae =

Family of flatworms

The Taeniidae /tɪˈnaɪ.ɪdiː/ are a family of tapeworms. It is the largest family representing the order Cyclophyllidea. It includes many species of medical and veterinary importance, as Taenia solium (pork tapeworm), Taenia saginata (beef tapeworm), and Echinococcus granulosus. The Taeniidae are parasites of mammals and many are infectious to humans.

== Taxonomy ==
The family includes four genera:

- Echinococcus Rudolphi, 1801
- Hydatigera Lamarck, 1816
- Taenia Linnaeus, 1758
- Versteria Nakao, Lavikainen, Iwaki, Haukisalmi, Konyaev, Oku, Okamoto & Ito, 2013

== Life cycle ==
Taeniidae parasites are distinguished by their terrestrial lifecycles, which include a dormant stage called a metacestode. These develop in the intermediate host's tissue when eggs are consumed. The eggs hatch into an oncosphere, which passes through the intestinal wall and forms the metacestode. An example is either cysticercoid, cysticercus, or a hydatid cyst. The definitive host is infected when the metacestode is consumed.
