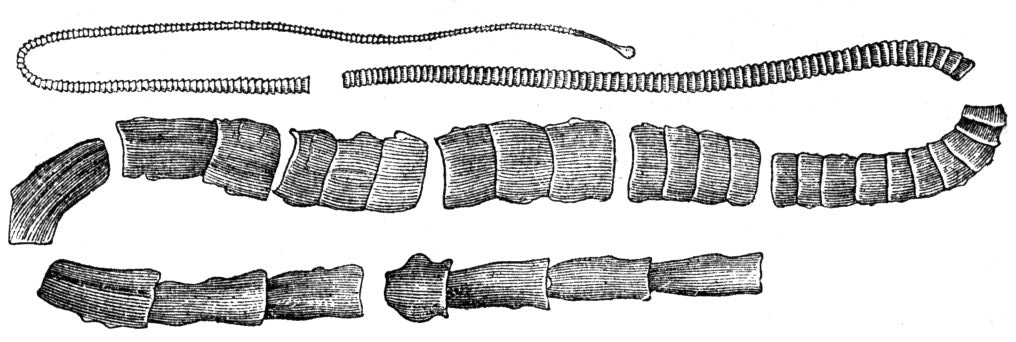
- Taenia saginata

Scientific classification
- Kingdom: Animalia
- Phylum: Platyhelminthes
- Class: Cestoda
- Subclass: Eucestoda
- Order: Cyclophyllidea

Families
- See text

Synonyms
- Aporidea

= Cyclophyllidea =

Order of flatworms

Cyclophyllidea (the cyclophyllid cestodes) is an order of Cestoda (tapeworm). It is the largest and most diverse order of Cestoda (tapeworm), encompassing species that infect all classes of terrestrial tetrapods including humans and domesticated animals, and includes species with some of the most severe health impact on wildlife, livestock, and humans.

All have multiple proglottid "segments", and all have four suckers on their scolices (heads), though some may have other structures, as well. Proglottids of this order have genital openings on one side (except in the Dilepididae, which have genital openings on both sides), and a compact yolk gland or vitellarium posterior to the ovary.

Families include:

- Dipylidiidae, the most important member of which is Dipylidium caninum, also called the "cucumber tapeworm" or the "double-pore tapeworm"
- Hymenolepididae, including the genus Hymenolepis, a human parasite
- Taeniidae, which consists of livestock parasites in the genus Taenia and parasites that encyst in humans of the genus Echinococcus
- Anoplocephalidae, which includes several tapeworms of horses and a genus of tapeworms of ruminants, the Moniezia
- Davaineidae, which comprises 14 genera, most of which are parasites of birds
- Acoleidae, which comprises two genera that parasitize birds
- Amabiliidae, comprising four genera that parasitize aquatic birds
- Dilepididae, comprising 24 or so genera
- Diploposthidae
- Gryporhynchidae
- Nematotaeniidae
- Progynotaeniidae
- Schistotaeniidae
