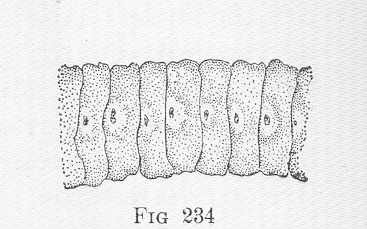
- Median segments of Diphyllobothrium dendriticum

Scientific classification
- Kingdom: Animalia
- Phylum: Platyhelminthes
- Class: Cestoda
- Order: Diphyllobothriidea
- Family: Diphyllobothriidae
- Genus: Diphyllobothrium
- Species: D. dendriticum

Binomial name
- Diphyllobothrium dendriticum (Nitzsch, 1824)

= Diphyllobothrium dendriticum =

Species of flatworm

Diphyllobothrium dendriticum is a large pseudophyllid cestode of the family Diphyllobothriidae.

For many years D. dendriticum infection was neglected. Diphyllobothriasis is not a life-threatening disease and most human cases are mild or even asymptomatic. The original distribution of D. dendriticum is circumboreal, but it was also found in Argentina and Chile.

== Life cycle ==
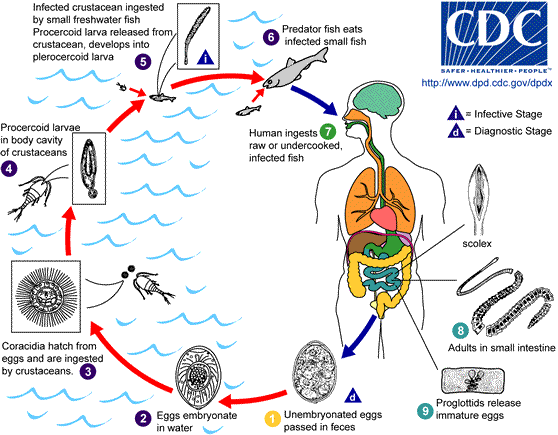
Life cycle of D. latum. Click the image to see full-size.

The life cycle of D. dendriticum is similar to life cycles of other Diphyllobothrium species, all of which include three hosts. Freshwater copepods serve as the first intermediate hosts; fish serve as the second intermediate hosts. Moreover, many predator fish species can be paratenic hosts for Diphyllobothriidae, i.e., accumulate plerocercoids (the larval stage that infects definitive hosts) in muscles and internal organs.

Eggs are passed unembryonated in feces. Under appropriate conditions, the eggs mature and yield oncosphere which develop into a coracidia. Planktonic copepods serve as the first intermediate hosts in which the larval stage, called procercoid develops. The second larval stage or metacestode, called plerocercoid, develops in second intermediate host, freshwater and anadromous fishes, especially salmonids. Because humans do not generally eat these small fish species raw, the second intermediate host probably does not represent an important source of human infection. However, these small second intermediate hosts can be eaten by larger predator species that then serve as paratenic host. Plerocercoid larvae is the infectious stage for the definitive host. Plerocercoids of D. dendriticum are usually encysted within the visceral organs or body cavity. Humans can become infected either by consuming raw or undercooked visceral organs, such as liver and ovaries.
