= Pseudophyllidea =

Scientific classification
- Kingdom: Animalia
- Phylum: Platyhelminthes
- Class: Cestoda
- Subclass: Eucestoda
- Order: Pseudophyllidea

Order of flatworms

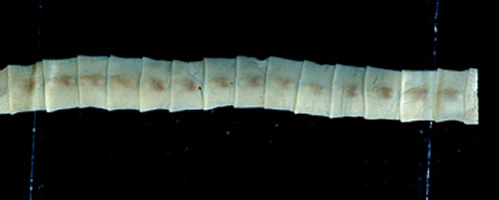
Pseudophyllid

Pseudophyllid cestodes (former order pseudophyllidea) are tapeworms with multiple "segments" (proglottids) and two bothria or "sucking grooves" as adults. Proglottids are identifiably pseudophyllid as the genital pore and uterine pore are located on the mid-ventral surface, and the ovary is bilobed ("dumbbell-shaped").

The order has been discovered by phylogenetic analysis to be paraphyletic, and has been broken up into two orders, Bothriocephalidea and Diphyllobothriidea. Eggs have one flat end (the operculum) and a small knob on the other end. All pseudophyllid cestodes have a procercoid stage in their life cycle, and most also have a plerocercoid stage.

The majority of genera in this group have fish as their definitive hosts, but the most important family of pseudophyllid cestodes is Diphyllobothriidae, which infect mammals, birds and reptiles as their definitive hosts and use either copepods (a group of small crustaceans found in the sea and nearly every freshwater habitat, e.g. Spirometra) or both copepods and fish as in the broadfish tapeworm as intermediate hosts. Typical mammalian hosts are whales and other cetaceans, and pinnipeds. The hermaphroditic Schistocephalus solidus parasitizes fish and fish-eating water birds, with a cyclopoid copepod as the first intermediate host.

When humans harbor plerocercoids of pseudophyllidean cestodes outside the small intestine, it can cause sparaganosis.
