= Spirometra erinaceieuropaei =

Scientific classification
- Kingdom: Animalia
- Phylum: Platyhelminthes
- Class: Cestoda
- Order: Diphyllobothriidea
- Family: Diphyllobothriidae
- Genus: Spirometra
- Species: S. erinaceieuropaei

Binomial name
- Spirometra erinaceieuropaei (Rudolphi, 1819) Mueller, 1937

Species of flatworm

Spirometra erinaceieuropaei is a parasitic tapeworm that infects domestic animals and humans. The medical term for this infection in humans and other animals is sparganosis. Morphologically, these worms are similar to other worms in the genus Spirometra. They have a long body consisting of three sections: the scolex, the neck, and the strobilia. They have a complex life cycle that consists of three hosts, and can live in varying environments and bodily tissues. Humans can contract this parasite in three main ways (ingestion of under cooked meat, contaminated water, or poultices contained contaminated flesh). Historically, humans are considered a paratenic host; however, the first case of an adult S. erinaceieuropaei infection in humans was reported in 2017. Spirometra tapeworms exist worldwide and infection is common in animals, but S. erinaceieuropaei infections are rare in humans. Treatment for infection typically includes surgical removal and anti-worm medication.

== Morphology ==
Adult Spirometra are typically large worms with long bodies consisting of three distinguishable body sections: the scolex, the neck, and the strobilia. Overall body length can reach up to several meters; however, this can vary depending on host species as well as other factors. The scolex is the spoon shaped anterior portion of the worm and consists of the head with attachments. Instead of hooks and distinct suckers (like most tape worms), S. erinaceieuropaei have two bothria. Bothria are grooves on the scolex that contain weak muscles that perform a sucking action. The neck is unsegmented and located between the scolex and the rest of the body. The proglottids make up the remainder of the body (everything after the neck), and together are termed the strobilia. As proglottids mature, they develop two sets of reproductive organs, one male and one female. Each proglottid is capable of reproducing via self fertilization. Eggs are typically ovoid in shape with tapered ends. Finally, should the head and neck be severed from one or all of the proglottids, S. erinaceieuropaei can regenerate a new body.

== Life cycle ==
The S. erinaceieuropaei life cycle is complex and consists of three hosts. The life cycle starts when eggs are discharged via feces from the definitive host. When discharged, the eggs are immature until they reach a fresh water source. Once in fresh water, the eggs hatch to become first stage larvae (coracidia). From here, coracidia are ingested by crustaceans (copepods), which become the first intermediate host. Inside the first intermediate host, the coracidia develop into procercoid larvae; however, this is still considered the first larval stage. Next, copepods are eaten by fish, reptiles, or other amphibians that become the second intermediate host. Inside the second intermediate host, the larvae will burrow into the intestinal tract where they develop into plerocercoid larvae (the final larval stage). In the final larvae stage, S. erinaceieuropaei migrate to subcutaneous tissues and/or muscles. Finally, the second intermediate host is eaten by a definitive host. A couple of weeks later, S. erinaceieuropaei mature into adult tapeworms and the life cycle continues. Adult tapeworms can survive up to 30 years in their definitive host (typically dogs and cats). The secondary intermediate host can also be eaten by other animals such as primates, pigs, mice, birds, and even humans. These animals become the paratenic hosts.

== Geographical distribution ==
Spirometra parasites are found worldwide. Most human cases are recorded from Southeast Asia; however, there are a significant number of animal cases in North America.

== Transmission to humans ==
There are three ways in which humans have become infected in the past: 1) Eating raw or under cooked snakes, frogs, and other four footed animals; 2) drinking contaminated water containing infected copepods; and 3) using raw snake or frog flesh in poultices that come in contact with intact human skin (Spirometra larvae have been shown to penetrate skin and cause infection in this manner.) This method was more prevalent in parts of Asia where poultices were used due to superstition.

Historically, humans have been identified as paratenic hosts for larvae; however, the first recorded infection by an adult S. erinaceieuropaei was reported in Vietnam in 2017. For this case, a 23-year-old male was admitted to the hospital with fever, weight loss, and gastric discomfort. Parasite eggs were discovered in his feces and were original thought to be from flukes. As a result, the patient was prescribed anti-worm medication. Two days later, proglottids were viewed in the patients stool. The species of the worm was identified as S. erinaceieuropaei via morphological and molecular methods. The patient fully recovered and was released from the hospital several days later.

== Pathology ==
Infection of S. erinaceieuropaei is termed sparganosis. However, this term encompasses the entire genus Spirometra and is not specific to S. erinaceieuropaei. Sparagnosis due to S. erinaceieuropaei is rare. Adults Spirometra typically infect dogs, cats and other carnivores. They will reproduce in their intestines, and the eggs will be shed in their feces. Although humans can get infected with this parasite, they cannot contract it from the feces of an infected cat or dog. Sparagnosis refers specifically to the infection with Spirometra larvae and is endemic in animals but a rare condition for humans. In humans, the larvae are typically found in subcutaneous tissues or muscle, and will form slowly growing masses. Sometimes infection in humans can also involve genitourinary tract, pleural or abdominal cavity, and scrotum. Infection can also involve the central nervous system, but this is even less common. When the central nervous system is involved, symptoms may occur as many as twenty years after infection. These can include weakness, headache, seizures, numbness, tingling, or abnormal skin sensations. Because the masses are typically slow growing, they often resemble tumors on radio graphs. Additionally, larvae may create migratory lesions (also called wandering lesions) within tissue. These lesions are a large sign of infection.

== Diagnoses and treatment ==
Infection in humans can be detected via imaging, but because larvae may appear as a mass, most diagnosis occurs after surgical removal. Diagnosis in animals is typically done by characterizing eggs in fecal matter. Since most tapeworm infections within the genus Spirometra have similar egg morphology, species characterization is not typical. Animals are usually treated with anti-worm medications, such as Praziquantel. Surgical removal is the most common treatment in humans, as well as treatment by anti-worm medication such as Albendazole.

== Genomics ==
The genome of S.erinaceieuropaei recovered from a patient's brain in 2014, was sequenced and is available through the WormBase ParaSite website.

== See also ==
- List of parasites (human)
