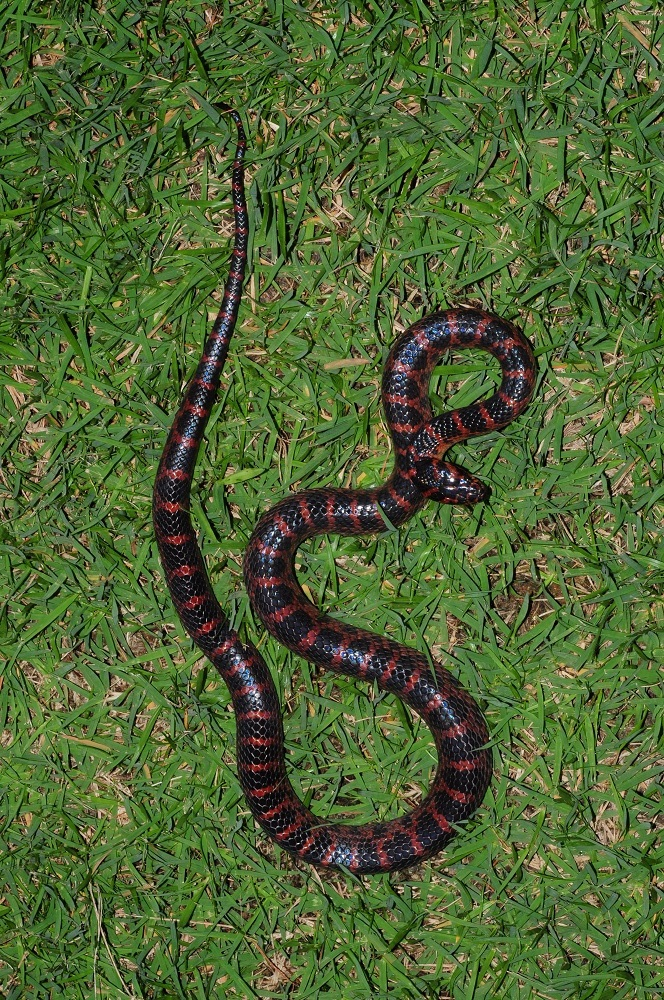

Conservation status
- Least Concern (IUCN 3.1)

Scientific classification
- Kingdom: Animalia
- Phylum: Chordata
- Class: Reptilia
- Order: Squamata
- Suborder: Serpentes
- Family: Colubridae
- Genus: Lycodon
- Species: L. rufozonatus

Binomial name
- Lycodon rufozonatus (Cantor, 1842)

Subspecies
- L. r. rufozonatus (Cantor, 1842); L. r. walli Stejneger, 1907

Synonyms
- Lycodon rufo-zonatus Cantor, 1842; Lycodon rufozonatus — Günther, 1864; Dinodon cancellatum A.M.C. Duméril, Bibron & A.H.A. Duméril, 1854; Coronella striata Hallowell, 1857; Dinodon rufozonatus — W. Peters, 1881; Dinodon rufozonatum — Stejneger, 1907; Lycodon rufozonatus — Siler et al., 2013

= Lycodon rufozonatus =

Species of snake

Lycodon rufozonatus is a species of snake in the family Colubridae. The species is native to East Asia. It is medium-sized, nocturnal, and is considered non-venomous. Two subspecies are recognised: one of which, L. r. walli, is restricted to the Ryukyu Archipelago; the other, L. r. rufozonatus (Cantor 1842), is found only in Korea & China.

== Etymology ==
The subspecific name, walli, is in honor of British herpetologist Frank Wall.

== Description ==
Lycodon rufozonatus typically grows to a total length (including tail) of around 70 centimetres (28 in), reaching up to 130 cm (51 in) in extreme cases. The head is long and relatively flat, and somewhat separate from the neck. The medium-sized eyes bulge slightly and have vertical pupils. The ventral scales have a strong keel, while the dorsal scales are only faintly keeled; the scale count is typically 17:17:15, but can be up to 21:19:17.

== Geographic range ==
Lycodon rufozonatus is found across a large part of East Asia, from the Korean Peninsula in the north (and extending just into easternmost Russia) to northern Laos and Vietnam in the south; the bulk of its range in found in eastern China. The continental populations are all placed in the nominate subspecies (L. r. rufozonatus); a second subspecies, L. r. walli, is found in the Ryukyu Archipelago of southern Japan.

== Behaviour and ecology ==
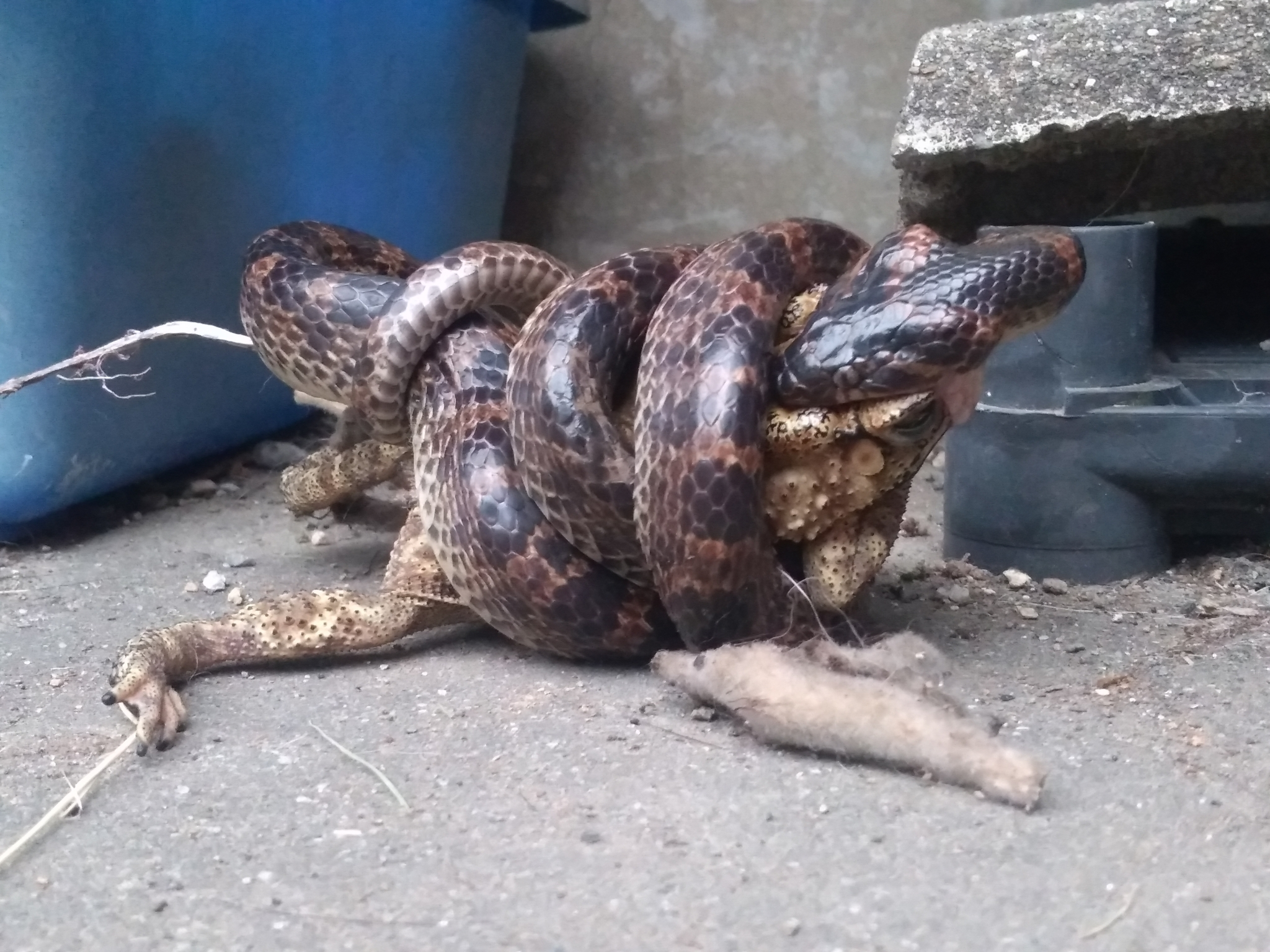
Eating an Asian common toad

Lycodon rufozonatus lives in a wide variety of habitats; it can be found from near sea level to as high as 2,000 metres (6,600 ft), and is most common near river plains. It is usually found on the ground, but is occasionally seen swimming in streams. It is nocturnal, feeding on fish, frogs, lizards, snakes and young birds. D. rufozonatus has a generally mild disposition, curling into a spherical mass with the head hidden when approached. Individuals can, however, be unpredictable, and some will bite readily. There are very few clinical reports on the toxinology of D. rufozonatus bites, but the species appears to be non-venomous. L. rufozonatus can harbour tapeworms of the genus Spirometra, and the consumption of raw meat from D. rufozonatus has led to cases of human sparganosis in Korea and Japan.

== Reproduction ==
L. rufozonatus is oviparous.

== Taxonomic history ==
The species was first described as "Lycodon rufo-zonatus " by Theodore Edward Cantor in an 1842 paper on the fauna of "Chusan" (Zhoushan, China) in the Annals and Magazine of Natural History. Cantor included it among the "innocuous" (not venomous) species, and described it as "Brown, with numerous transversal crimson bands; the abdominal surface pearl-coloured, spotted with black on the tail".

== Common names ==
L. rufozonatus is known by several common names, including "Asian king snake", "banded red snake", "red banded krait", "red banded odd-toothed snake" and "red-banded snake".
