= Diphyllobothrium elegans =

Scientific classification
- Kingdom: Animalia
- Phylum: Platyhelminthes
- Class: Cestoda
- Order: Diphyllobothriidea
- Family: Diphyllobothriidae
- Genus: Diphyllobothrium
- Species: D. elegans

Binomial name
- Diphyllobothrium elegans (Krabbe, 1865) Meggitt, 1924

Synonyms
- Bothriocephalus elegans Krabbe, 1865; Diphyllobothrium pterocephalum Delyamure & Skryabin, 1967

Species of flatworm

Diphyllobothrium elegans is a species of tapeworms. It has been found in the hooded seal (Cystophora cristata).
