= Tetragonoporus =

Scientific classification
- Kingdom: Animalia
- Phylum: Platyhelminthes
- Class: Cestoda
- Order: Diphyllobothriidea
- Family: Diphyllobothriidae
- Genus: Tetragonoporus; Skryabin, 1961
- Species: T. calyptocephalus

Binomial name
- Tetragonoporus calyptocephalus Skryabin, 1961

Synonyms
- Polygonoporus giganticus Skryabin, 1967

Genus of tapeworms

Tetragonoporus is a genus of cestodes in the order Pseudophyllidea. It is a monotypic genus, and the only species is Tetragonoporus calyptocephalus, previously known as Polygonoporus giganticus. This tapeworm is a gut parasite of whales.

== Description ==
The adult T. calyptocephalus is found in the gut of whales such as the sperm whale. It is normally present in the intestine, but can also occur in the bile duct. The tapeworm can be almost 40 m (130 ft) in length with as many as 45,000 proglottids (segments). The scolex (head) of the tapeworm is attached to the lining of the gut and the proglottids continuously develop from behind the scolex. As more segments are produced, the older ones become larger and more mature.

In this species, the scolex is short and equipped with two suckers, and the proglottids develop in groups of three different sizes – small, medium and large – which are repeated throughout the length of the strobila (segmented body). The cuticle is thin and there are longitudinal and transverse muscles underneath. The internal longitudinal muscle is very well-developed. The front part of the tapeworm is milky-white but further back it is grey. Each segment has several sets of ovaries and testes and produces very large numbers of eggs (probably more than the 700,000 a day produced by the beef tapeworm, Taenia saginata). In one study by the Russian zoologist A. Skryabin, who described T. calyptocephalus in 1961, the largest proglottids were 5 cm (2 in) wide and contained fourteen gonads.

Mating takes place between two proglottids from either the same or different tapeworms. When sufficiently mature, the terminal proglottids are shed, being expelled from the host with the whale's fæces. Compared with their free-living relatives, parasites tend to be more fecund, and the whale tapeworm is likely to produce billions of eggs during its lifetime. Considering why the worms should have evolved this enormous fecundity, Gerald D. Schmidt and Larry S. Roberts (1977) reflected that "There are few whales and the ocean is large".

== Distribution ==
This tapeworm occurs exclusively in Arctic waters. It is found in toothed whales such as sperm whales.
