= Braunia =

Braunia may refer to:

- Braunia (plant), a genus of mosses in the family Hedwigiaceae
- Braunia, a genus of flatworms in the family Diphyllobothriidae, synonym of Ligula
- Braunia, a genus of fungi in the family Strophariaceae, synonym of Brauniella
