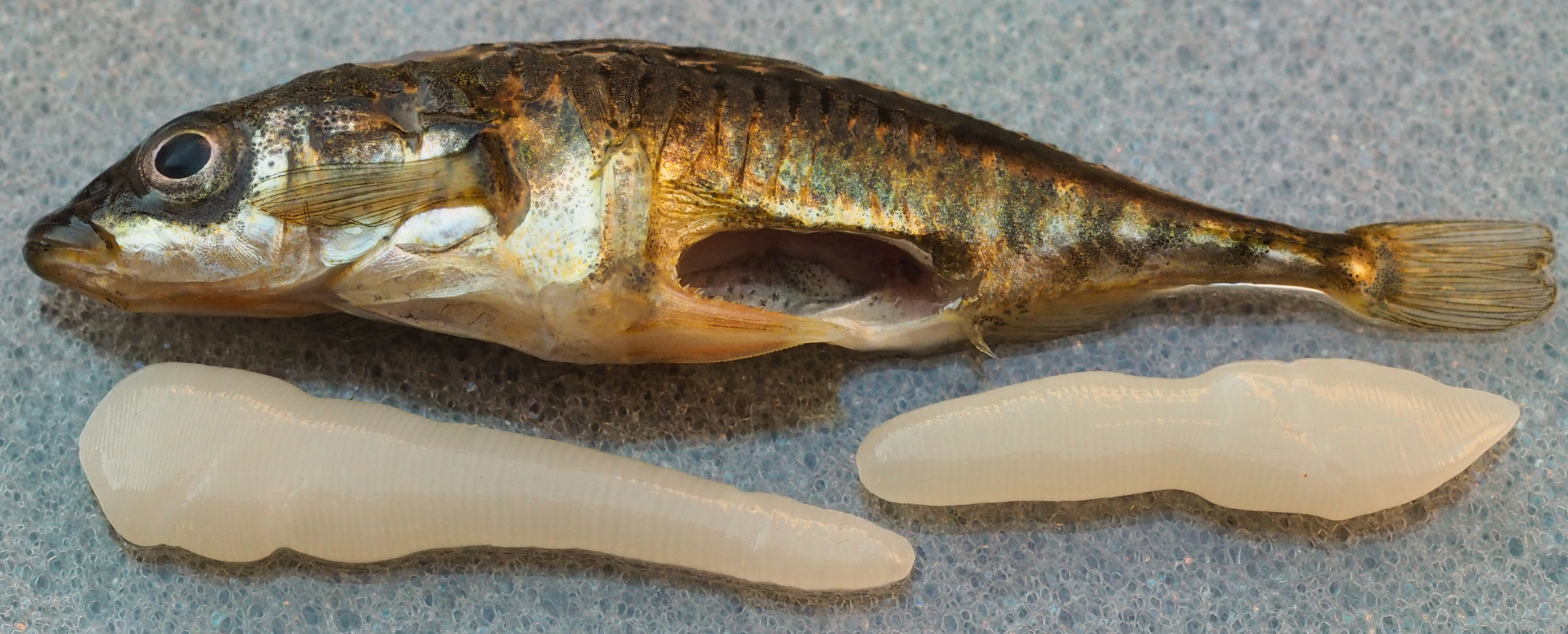
- Schistocephalus solidus with its host, the three-spined stickleback

Scientific classification
- Kingdom: Animalia
- Phylum: Platyhelminthes
- Class: Cestoda
- Order: Diphyllobothriidea
- Family: Diphyllobothriidae
- Genus: Schistocephalus
- Species: S. solidus

Binomial name
- Schistocephalus solidus (Müller, 1776) Steenstrup, 1857

Synonyms
- Taenia solidus Müller, 1776

= Schistocephalus solidus =

Species of flatworm

Schistocephalus solidus is a tapeworm of fish, fish-eating birds, and rodents. This hermaphroditic parasite belongs to the Eucestoda subclass of class Cestoda. This species has been used to demonstrate that cross-fertilization produces a higher infection success rate than self-fertilization.

== Life cycle ==
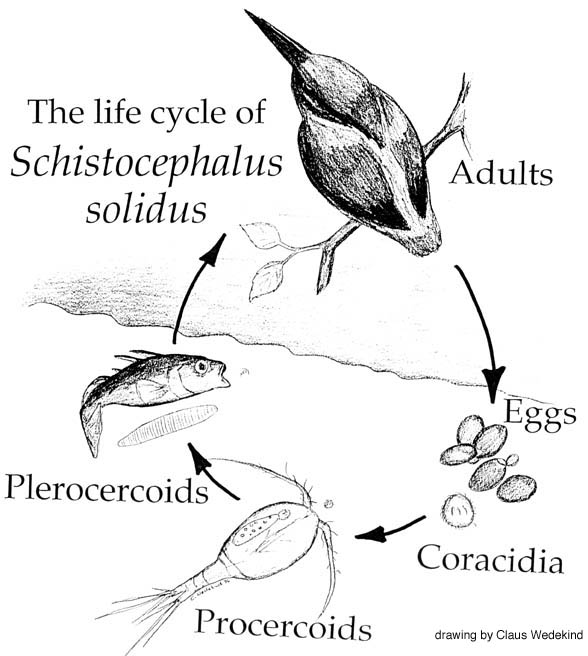
Life cycle of Schistocephalus solidus

It parasitizes fish and fish-eating water birds. The fish-eating water bird is the definitive host, and reproduction occurs in the bird's intestine. Eggs of the tapeworm are passed with the bird's feces and hatch in the water, where the first larval stage, the coracidium, is produced. The coracidium is then ingested by the first intermediate host, a cyclopoid copepod (e.g. Macrocyclops albidus). The second larval stage then subsequently develops in the tissue of this host. Within one to two weeks, the infected copepod is ingested by the second intermediate host, the three-spined stickleback, Gasterosteus aculeatus. The third larval stage, the plerocercoid, grows in the abdomen of the fish. When the fish is eaten by a bird, the larvae mature and adults start to produce eggs within two days. Reproduction takes place within one to two weeks, after which the parasite dies.

== Ecology ==
Prevalence — the proportion of host population infected — in naturally infected populations of the first intermediate hosts is likely low. Conversely, in populations where Schistocephalus solidus infects the second intermediate host (three-spined stickleback) it can reach high prevalence, up to 93% in both European and North American populations

The growth of S. solidus in the second intermediate host is largely dependent upon the environmental temperatures. At an increase of temperature from 15 °C to 20 °C the growth of S. solidus can grow four times as fast. At the same time, the growth rate of the stickleback is significantly reduced.

=== Reproduction ===
Reproduction of S. solidus in the definitive bird host in which it resides for a maximum of two weeks. Because adult worms are hermaphroditic eggs can be fertilised in three different ways; (1) self-fertilization (2) breeding with a sibling (3) breeding with an unrelated individual. In most species outbreeding (mating with an unrelated individual) would be preferred, but advantages and disadvantages of each of these breeding strategies have been argued. In short, self-fertilization is advantageous when no mating partners are around, but might lead to inbreeding depression—the reduced fitness of offspring because of the unmasking of deleterious recessive alleles due to the breeding of closely related individuals. Similarly, breeding with a sibling, also known as incestuous mating, also shares some of the same disadvantages as self-fertilization does—inbreeding depression and lack of genetic variation. But incestuous mating is advantageous because it helps maintain gene complexes within the family which may be important for local adaptation. Breeding with unrelated individuals might seem to be most advantageous choice of mating because it increases genetic variation and avoids inbreeding depression, but it could be more time-consuming as partners might not always be available.

In Schistocephalus solidus inbreeding is indeed disadvantageous, as mating between siblings generally produce a 3.5 times reduction in hatching success of the eggs produced from these matings compared to mating with unrelated individuals. Outcrossing also increases the chances of infecting the second intermediate host. However, there is also a preference to pair with larger mates, and to avoid very small mates. The later means that self-fertilisation can also occur when potential partners are available. Under some circumstances, there could exist a significant advantage for incestuous mating, despite inbreeding depression. In species where there is low parental investment and sexual encounters are rare and sequential, incestuous breeding is indirectly beneficial. If the prospective mates are related there is an increase mutual interest in finding a resolution with respect to playing the unpreferred sexual role. With less time allotted to conflicting over sexual roles and dominating one another, procreation is more cost-effective. Under these conditions, the greater effectiveness of inbreeding prevails over the detriment of incestuous mating and evolutionarily select for a preference for related mates.

=== Infectivity ===
Corracidia are more infective to male copepods than to female copepods. This has been suggested to be due to the negative impacts sex hormones such as testosterone can have on the immune system.

=== Viruses ===
Schistocephalus solidus itself a parasite, can also get infected by parasites (known as hyperparasites), including viruses. These viruses are likely to affect the evolution of the virulence and broader interactions of S. solidus with its hosts.

== Host manipulation ==
The Schistocephalus solidus parasite is capable of host manipulation in both intermediate hosts, the copepod and the three-spined stickleback.

=== First intermediate host ===
In the copepod host, it is able to suppress activity while uninfective to the stickleback host. This reduces the likelihood of the copepod host being consumed and consequently unsuccessful transmission of the parasite. Once the parasite becomes infective, after approximately two weeks, activity increases and, as a consequence, the risk of consumption by three-spined sticklebacks increases. However, when multiple, non-simultaneous infections by S. solidus occur, host manipulation is orchestrated by the first infecting parasite. This increases the risk of premature consumption of the subsequent infections by the fish host. Consistent differences in manipulation are seen between parasite genotypes and populations. Differences in host genotypes are maintained after infections, but less pronounced.

=== Second intermediate host ===
In the fish host, host manipulation induces more risk taking behaviour like positive geotaxis and negative thigmotaxis. This change in behaviour is unlikely to be caused solely by the mechanical presence of the parasite. Phenotype modification, through injecting silicon "parasites", with densities and sizes similar to infective plerocercoids (~150 mg) did not alter behaviour. Physiologically, S. solidus is a parasite that inhibits egg production in female three-spined sticklebacks in European populations, but not in Alaskan populations where only egg mass is reduced. The egg mass of fish was correlated to the parasite index, which indicates that the reduction in egg mass is a non-adaptive side effect of parasite infection.

== Model species ==
Schistocephalus solidus is effectively used a model species for studying the evolutionary dynamics of host-parasite interactions. More recently, it was proposed a model to study host-parasite-microbe interactions

=== in vitro breeding ===
The option to breed S. solidus in the laboratory makes them a useful model for studying host-parasite interactions. For 'culturing' of the worm progenetic plerocercoids are dissected from the stickleback host. The worm can then be incubated in a dialysis tube embedded in culture medium and kept at 40 °C. These worms are then ideally incubated in pairs of similar size to maximise outcrossing and egg hatching. Optionally, large S. solidus worms can also be cut into smaller pieces and incubated separately.
