= Diphyllobothriasis =

- Specialty: Infectious diseases, helminthologist

Diphyllobothriasis is the infection caused by tapeworms of the genus Diphyllobothrium (commonly D. latum and D. nihonkaiense).

Diphyllobothriasis mostly occurs in regions where raw fish is regularly consumed; those who consume raw fish are at risk of infection. The infection is often asymptomatic and usually presents only with mild symptoms, which may include gastrointestinal complaints, weight loss, and fatigue. Rarely, vitamin B12 deficiency (possibly leading to anaemia) and gastrointestinal obstructions may occur. Infection may be long-lasting in absence of treatment. Diphyllobothriasis is generally diagnosed by looking for eggs or tapeworm segments in passed stool. Treatment with antiparasitic medications is straightforward, effective, and safe.

== Signs and symptoms ==
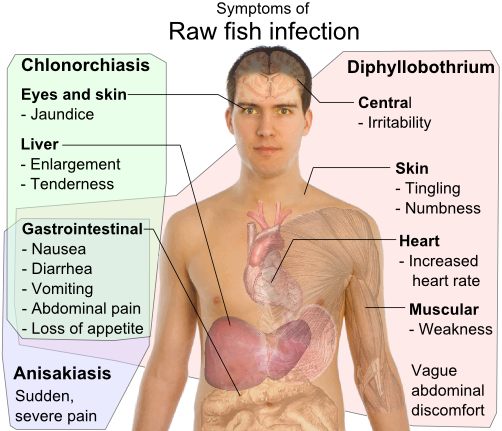
Symptoms of parasite infection by raw fish: Clonorchis sinensis (a trematode/fluke), Anisakis (a nematode/roundworm) and Diphyllobothrium a (cestode/tapeworm), all have gastrointestinal, but otherwise distinct, symptoms.

Most infections (~80%) are asymptomatic. Infections may be long-lasting, persisting for many years or decades (up to 25 years) if untreated.

Symptoms (when present) are generally mild. Manifestations may include abdominal pain and discomfort, diarrhea, vomiting, constipation, weight loss, and fatigue.

Additional symptoms have been reported/described, including dyspepsia, abdominal distension (commonly as presenting complaint), headache, myalgia, and dizziness.

=== Complications ===
While the infection is generally mild, complications may occur. Complications are predicated on parasite burden, and are generally related to vitamin B12 deficiency and related health conditions.

==== Vitamin B12 deficiency and anaemia ====
Vitamin B12 deficiency with subsequent megaloblastic anaemia (which is indistinguishable from pernicious anaemia) may occur in some instances of the disease. Anaemia may in turn result in subacute combined degeneration of the spinal cord and cognitive decline.

D. latum competes with the host for vitamin B12 absorption, absorbing some 80% of dietary intake and causing deficiency and megaloblastic anaemia in some 40% of cases. Vitamin B12 uptake is enabled by the position of the parasite which usually lodges in the jejunum. Vitamin B12 deficiency is – according to research – conversely seldom seen in D. pacificum infection.

==== Gastrointestinal obstructions ====
Rarely, massive infections may result in intestinal obstruction. Migration of proglottids can cause cholecystitis or cholangitis.

== Cause ==
Diphyllobothriasis is caused by infection by several species of the Diphyllobothrium genus.

=== Transmission ===
Humans are one of the definitive hosts of Diphyllobothrium tapeworms, along with other carnivores, fish-eating mammals (including canids, felids, and bears), marine mammals (dolphins, porpoises, and whales); a few birds (e.g. gulls) may also serve as definitive hosts.

Definitive hosts release eggs in faeces; the eggs then mature in ~18–20 days if under favourable conditions. Crustaceans serve as the first intermediate hosts, and Diphyllobothrium larvae develop. The larvae are released when crustaceans are consumed by predators, which serve as second intermediate hosts (these are mostly small fish). Larvae move into deeper tissues in the second intermediate host. Second intermediate hosts do not serve as an important source of infection of humans as these are not regularly consumed raw. Consumption of infected second intermediate hosts by larger predatory fish, which serve as paratenic hosts; the parasites thereupon migrate into the musculature awaiting consumption by definitive hosts in which adult tapeworms will then finally develop in the small intestine to release up to a million immature eggs per day per parasite. Hosts begin to release eggs 5–6 weeks after infection.

== Pathophysiology ==
Tapeworms develop in the small intestine. Adults attach to the intestinal mucosa. Adult tapeworms may grow to over 10 m in length and may constitute of over 3,000 proglottids which contain sets of male and female reproductive organs, allowing for high fecundity. Eggs appear in the faeces 5–6 weeks after infection.

D. latum tapeworms are the longest and typically reach a length of 4–15 m, but may grow up to 25 m in length within the human intestine. Growth rate may exceed 22 cm/day. D. latum tapeworms feature an anterior end (scolex) equipped with attachment grooves on the dorsal and ventral surfaces.

=== Host–parasite interactions ===
Diphyllobothriasis is postulated to cause changes in neuromodulator concentrations in host tissue and serum. D. latum infection has been shown to cause local changes in the host, leading to altered GI function (including motility) via neuroendocrine modulation.

Diphyllobothriasis causes mast cell and eosinophil degranulation, leading to pro-inflammatory cytokine release.

== Diagnosis ==
Infection may be suspected based upon an individual's occupation, hobbies, eating habits, and travel history. During diagnostic procedures, standard safety precautions apply. Eggs are not directly infectious to humans (in contrast to some other tapeworm species).

=== Microscopy ===
Diagnosis is usually made by identifying proglottid segments, or characteristic eggs in the faeces. Eggs are usually numerous and can be demonstrated without concentration techniques. Morphologic comparison with other intestinal parasites may be employed as a further diagnostic approach.

These simple diagnostic techniques are able to identify the nature of the infection to the genus level, which is usually sufficient in a clinical setting. Though it is difficult to identify the eggs or proglottids to the species level, the distinction is of little clinical importance because – like most adult tapeworms in the intestine – all members of the genus respond to the same treatments. Treatment may distort morphological features of expelled pathogen tissues and complicate subsequent morphological diagnosis attempts.

=== Genetic identification ===
When the exact species needs be determined (e.g. in epidemiological studies), restriction fragment length polymorphisms can be effectively used. Polymerase chain reaction (PCR) can be performed on samples of purified eggs, or on native faecal samples following sonication of the eggs to release their contents. Molecular identification is currently generally only used in research.

=== Radiography ===
A potential diagnostic tool and treatment is the contrast medium gastrografin which, when introduced into the duodenum, allows both visualization of the parasite, and has also been shown to cause detachment and passing of the whole parasite.

== Prevention ==
Ingestion of raw freshwater fish should be avoided. Adequate cooking or freezing of freshwater fish will destroy the encysted fish tapeworm larvae. Fish that is thoroughly cooked, brined, or frozen at −10 °C for 24–48 hours can also be consumed without risk of D. latum infection. Public health information campaigns may be employed to educate the public about the risks of consuming improperly prepared fish.

Because human feces are an important mechanism for spreading eggs, proper disposal of sewage can reduce fish (and therefore human) infections. Prevention of water contamination may be achieved both by raising public awareness of the dangers of defecating in recreational bodies of water and by implementation of basic sanitation measures and screening and successful treatment of people infected with the parasite.

== Treatment ==
Upon diagnosis, treatment is simple and effective.

=== Praziquantel ===
The standard treatment for diphyllobothriasis (as well as many other tapeworm infections) is a single dose of praziquantel, 5–10 mg/kg orally once for both adults and children. Praziquantel is not FDA-approved for this indication. Praziquantel has few side effects, many of which are similar to the symptoms of diphyllobothriasis.

=== Niclosamide ===
An alternative treatment is niclosamide, 2 g orally once for adults or 50 mg/kg (max 2 g) for children. Niclosamide is not available for human or even animal use in the United States. Side effects of niclosamide are very rare due to the fact that the medication is not absorbed in the gastrointestinal tract.

=== Other ===
Reportedly, albendazole can also be effective. Gastrografin may be potentially used both as a diagnostic and therapeutic; when introduced into the duodenum it allows for the visualization of the parasite, and has also been shown to cause detachment and passing of the whole worm. During the 1940s, the preferred treatment was 6 to 8 grams of oleoresin of aspidium, which was introduced into the duodenum via a Rehfuss tube.

== Epidemiology ==
People at high risk for infection have traditionally been those who regularly consume raw fish. While people of any gender or age may fall sick, the majority of identified cases occurred in middle-aged men.

=== Geographical distribution ===
Diphyllobothriasis occurs in areas where lakes and rivers coexist with human consumption of raw or undercooked freshwater fish. Such areas are found in Europe, newly independent states of the former Soviet Union, North America, Asia, Uganda, Peru (because of ceviche), and Chile. Many regional cuisines include raw or undercooked food, including sushi and sashimi in Japanese cuisine, carpaccio di persico in Italian, tartare maison in French-speaking populations, ceviche in Latin American cuisine and marinated herring in Scandinavia. With emigration and globalization, the practice of eating raw fish in these and other dishes has brought diphyllobothriasis to new parts of the world and created new endemic foci of disease.

Infections in Europe and North America were traditionally associated with Jewish women due to the practice of tasting bits of uncooked fish during preparation of the gefilte fish dish, and also occurred in Scandinavian women for the same reason. Diphyllobothriasis was thus also referred to as the "Jewish housewife's disease" or the "Scandinavian housewife's disease".

==== Japan ====
Diphyllobothriasis nihonkaiense was once endemic to coastal provinces of central and northern Japan, where salmon fisheries thrived. In recent decades, regions with endemic diphyllobothriasis nihonkaiense have disappeared from Japan, though cases continue to be reported among urbanites who consume sushi or sashimi. In Kyoto, it is estimated that the average annual incidence in the past 20 years was 0.32/100,000, and that in 2008 was 1.0 case per 100,000 population, suggesting that D. nihonkaiense infection is equally as prevalent in Japan as D. latum is in some European countries.

==== United States ====
The disease is rare in the United States.

== History ==
The fish tapeworm has a long documented history of infecting people who regularly consume fish and especially those whose customs include the consumption of raw or undercooked fish. In the 1970s, most of the known cases of diphyllobothriasis came from Europe (5 million cases), and Asia (4 million cases) with fewer cases coming from North America and South America, and no reliable data on cases from Africa or Australia. Despite the relatively small number of cases seen today in South America, some of the earliest archeological evidence of diphyllobothriasis comes from sites in South America. Evidence of Diphyllobothrium spp. has been found in 4,000- to 10,000-year-old human remains on the western coast of South America. There is no clear point in time when Diphyllobothrium latum and related species were "discovered" in humans, but it is clear that diphyllobothriasis has been endemic in human populations for a very long time. Due to the changing dietary habits in many parts of the world, autochthonous, or locally acquired, cases of diphyllobothriasis have recently been documented in previously non-endemic areas, such as Brazil. In this way, diphyllobothriasis represents an emerging infectious disease in certain parts of the world where cultural practices involving eating raw or undercooked fish are being introduced.
