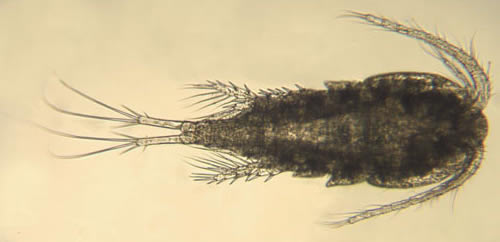

Scientific classification
- Domain: Eukaryota
- Kingdom: Animalia
- Phylum: Arthropoda
- Class: Copepoda
- Order: Cyclopoida
- Family: Cyclopidae
- Genus: Cyclops
- Species: C. strenuus

Binomial name
- Cyclops strenuus Fischer, 1851

= Cyclops strenuus =

Species of crustacean

Cyclops strenuus (Fisher) is a common species of copepod in small water bodies in central Europe.

The life-cycle of C. strenuus varies depending on habitat type and climate. In some habitat year round reproduction occurs. While in others one or two distinct generations exist with summer diapause. During diapause copepodid IV resting stages are produced that are largely inactive. These resting stages can survive in mud, to survive dry summer periods. During autumn, with a change in environmental conditions, resting stages become more active again and develop further into adult copepods.

== Ecology ==
Cyclops strenuus occurs in temperate habitats. Normal activity occurs between 3 and 21 °C and temperatures above 26 °C are actively avoided.

It is also a common intermediate host of cestode parasites, such as Schistocephalus solidus. When infected with this parasite reproduction of female C. strenuus is significantly reduced
