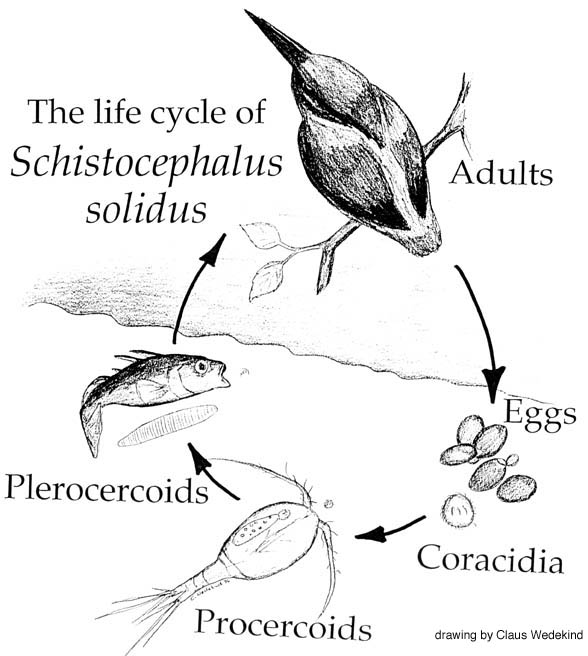
- Drawing of the life cycle of Schistocephalus solidus

Scientific classification
- Kingdom: Animalia
- Phylum: Platyhelminthes
- Class: Cestoda
- Order: Diphyllobothriidea
- Family: Diphyllobothriidae
- Genus: Schistocephalus; Creplin, 1829

= Schistocephalus =

Genus of tapeworms

Schistocephalus is a genus of tapeworm of fish, fish-eating birds and rodents.

== Diversity ==
Three species of Schistocephalus have been described;

- Schistocephalus
  - - S. cotti Chubb, 2006
    - S. pungitii Dubinina, 1959
    - S. solidus (Müller, 1776)
