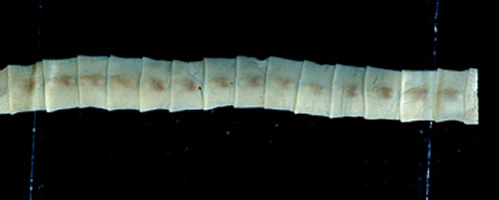
- Proglottids of D. latum

Scientific classification
- Kingdom: Animalia
- Phylum: Platyhelminthes
- Class: Cestoda
- Order: Diphyllobothriidea
- Family: Diphyllobothriidae
- Genus: Diphyllobothrium; Cobbold, 1858

Species
- Diphyllobothrium cordatum; Diphyllobothrium dendriticum; Diphyllobothrium elegans; Diphyllobothrium lanceolatum; Diphyllobothrium latum

Synonyms
- Cordicephalus Wardle, McLeod & Stewart, 1947

= Diphyllobothrium =

Genus of flatworms

Diphyllobothrium is a genus of tapeworms which can cause diphyllobothriasis in humans through consumption of raw or undercooked fish. The principal species causing diphyllobothriasis is Diphyllobothrium latum, commonly known as the broad or fish tapeworm, or broad fish tapeworm. D. latum is a pseudophyllid cestode that infects fish and mammals. D. latum is native to Scandinavia, western Russia, and the Baltics, though it is now also present in North America, especially the Pacific Northwest. In Far East Russia, D. klebanovskii, having Pacific salmon as its second intermediate host, was identified.

Other members of the genus Diphyllobothrium include D. dendriticum (the salmon tapeworm), which has a much larger range (the whole Northern Hemisphere), D. pacificum, D. cordatum, D. ursi, D. lanceolatum, D. dalliae, and D. yonagoensis, all of which infect humans only infrequently. In Japan, the most common species in human infection is D. nihonkaiense, which was only identified as a separate species from D. latum in 1986. More recently, a molecular study found D. nihonkaiense and D. klebanovskii to be a single species.

== Morphology ==
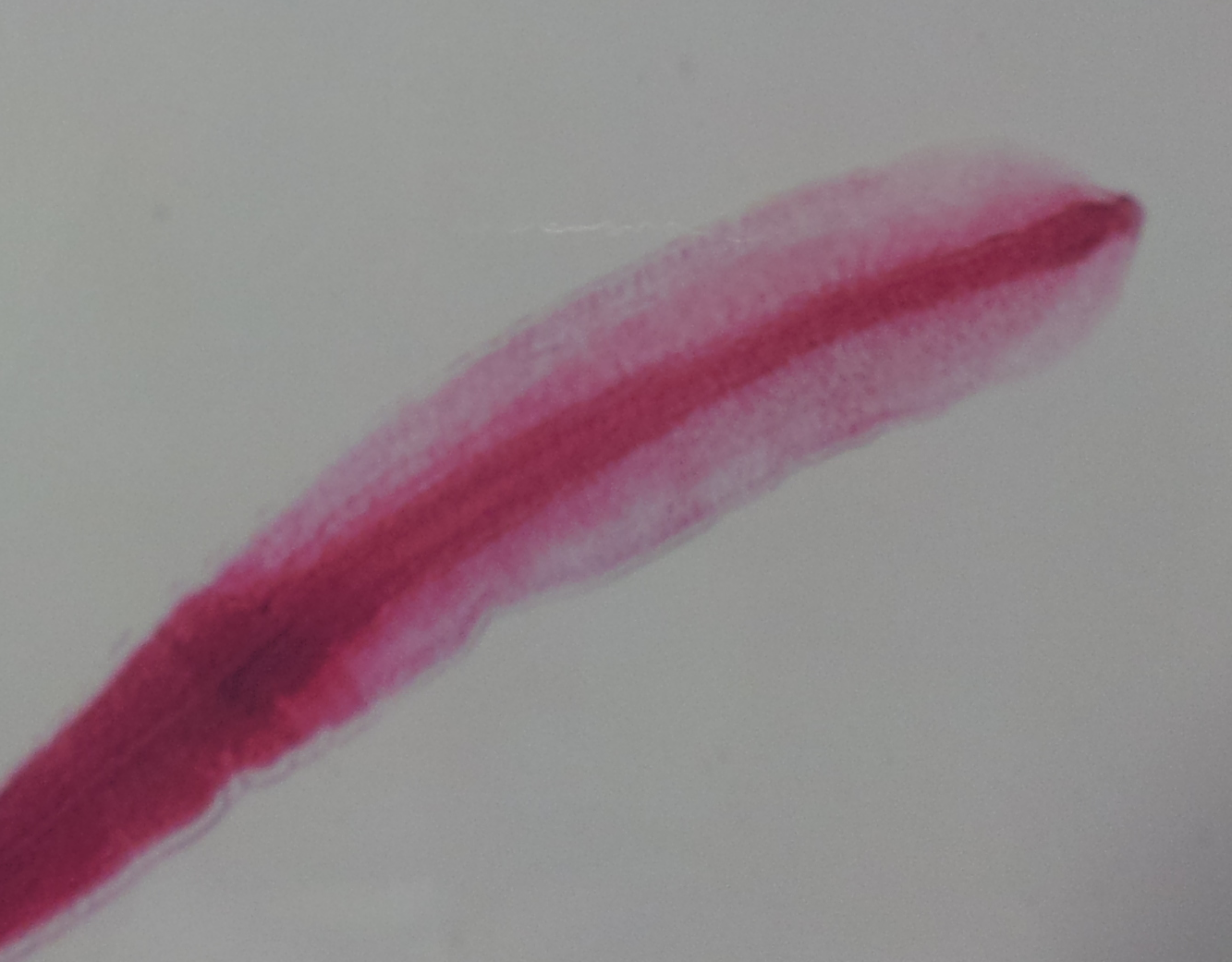
Diphyllobothrium latum scolex

The adult worm is composed of three fairly distinct morphological segments: the scolex (head), the neck, and the lower body. Each side of the scolex has a slit-like groove, which is a bothrium for attachment to the intestine. The scolex attaches to the neck, or proliferative region. From the neck grow many proglottid segments which contain the reproductive organs of the worm. D. latum is the longest tapeworm in humans, averaging ten meters long. Unlike many other tapeworms, Diphyllobothrium eggs are typically unembryonated when passed in human feces.

In adults, proglottids are wider than they are long (hence the name broad tapeworm). As in all pseudophyllid cestodes, the genital pores open midventrally.

== Taxonomy ==
Diphyllobothrium has seen many changes since Linnaeus first described Taenia lata. Over 50 species are currently recognized, and at least 14 of these have been reported in human infections, especially in circumpolar and Pacific regions.

Despite this, the evolutionary relationships within the genus are still not well understood, mainly due to limited DNA data for many species. Some studies suggest that D. pacificum and D. stemmacephalum are among the earliest lineages. D. nihonkaiense appears to branch off early in a group that includes D. latum, D. dendriticum, and D. ditremum, as well as related bird parasites from the Cestodes genera Ligula and Digramma.

This suggests that Diphyllobothrium may not be a single, unified group—possibly forming a para- or polyphyletic cluster instead. Interestingly, molecular data also shows that Diplogonoporus balanopterae, a human-infecting species with doubled genitalia per segment, should be considered part of Diphyllobothrium as well.

== Life cycle ==
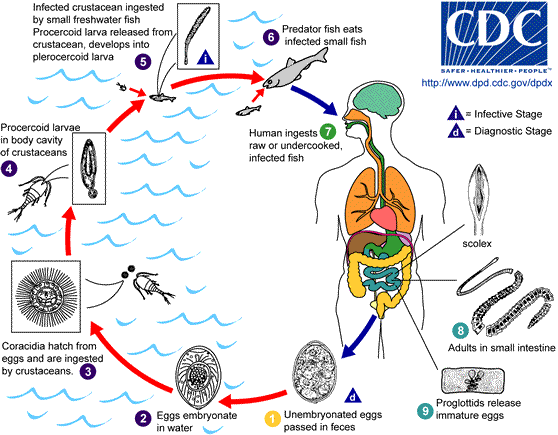
Life cycle of D. latum. Click the image to see full-size.

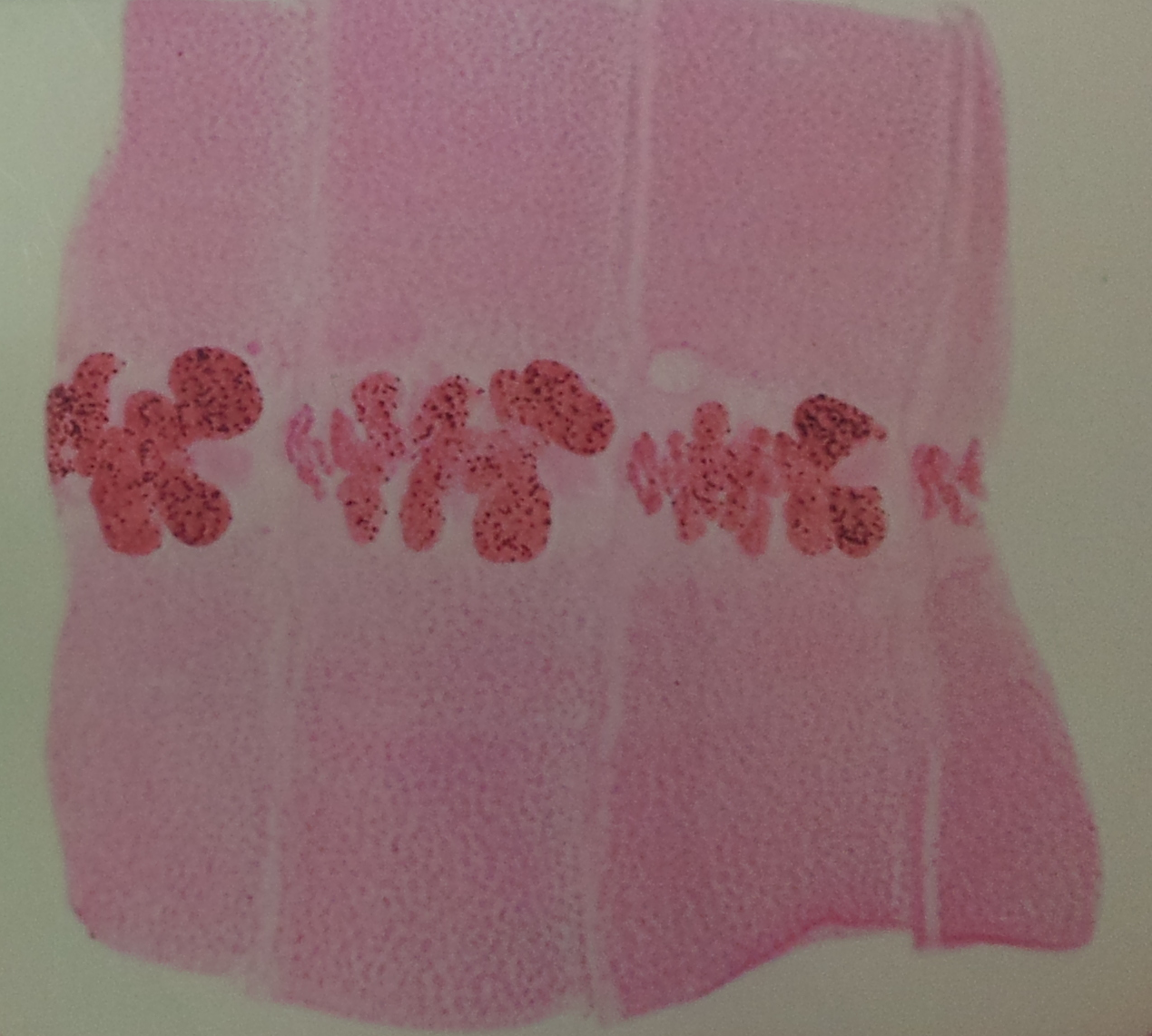
Diphyllobothrium latum proglottid

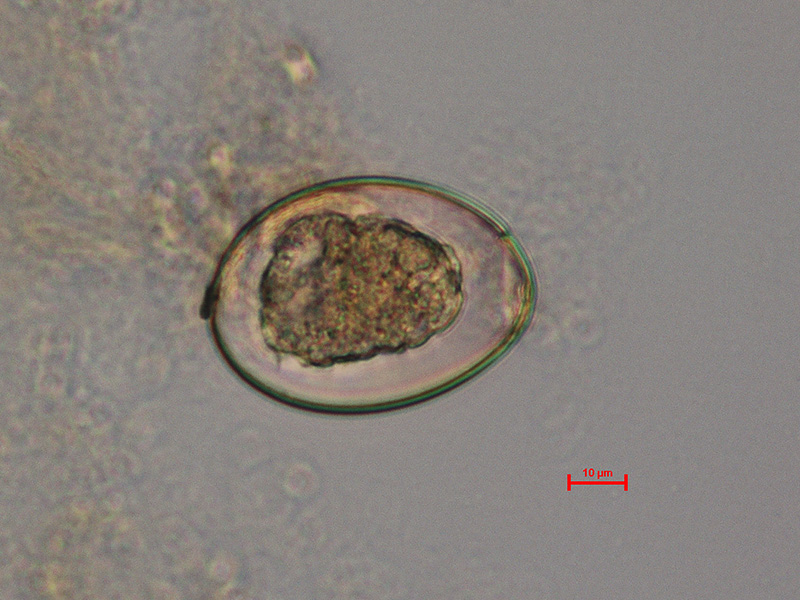
Diphyllobothrium latum – fertilized egg

Adult tapeworms may infect humans, canids, felines, bears, pinnipeds, and mustelids, though the accuracy of the records for some of the nonhuman species is disputed. Immature eggs are passed in feces of the mammal host (the definitive host, where the worms reproduce). After ingestion by a suitable freshwater crustacean such as a copepod (the first intermediate host), the coracidia develop into procercoid larvae. Following ingestion of the copepod by a suitable second intermediate host, typically a minnow or other small freshwater fish, the procercoid larvae are released from the crustacean and migrate into the fish's flesh where they develop into a plerocercoid larvae (sparganum). The plerocercoid larvae are the infective stage for the definitive host (including humans).

Because humans do not generally eat undercooked minnows and similar small freshwater fish, these do not represent an important source of infection. Nevertheless, these small second intermediate hosts can be eaten by larger predator species, for example trout, perch, walleye, and pike. In this case, the sparganum can migrate to the musculature of the larger predator fish and mammals can acquire the disease by eating these later intermediate infected host fish raw or undercooked. After ingestion of the infected fish, the plerocercoids develop into immature adults and then into mature adult tapeworms which will reside in the small intestine. The adults attach to the intestinal mucosa by means of the two bilateral grooves (bothria) of their scolices. The adults can reach more than 10 m (up to 30 ft) in length in some species such as D. latum, with more than 3,000 proglottids. One or several of the tape-like proglottid segments (hence the name tapeworm) regularly detach from the main body of the worm and release immature eggs in freshwater to start the cycle over again. Immature eggs are discharged from the proglottids (up to 1,000,000 eggs per day per worm) and are passed in the feces. The incubation period in humans, after which eggs begin to appear in the feces is typically 4–6 weeks, but can vary from as short as 2 weeks to as long as 2 years.

== Disease ==
Diphyllobothriasis is considered a parasitic, zoonotic infection. Humans have been parasitized by these tapeworms for thousands of years. D. latum causes a wide spectrum of disease and severity. The tapeworm induces changes in the concentration of several immunomodulators in the host. It can also cause structural changes in the GI tract as it modulates neuroendocrine responses and enhances secretion and gut motility. Damage may also come from the body's immune response against the worm and its millions of eggs (around 1 million/day) mediated by mast cells, eosinophilic cell degranulations resulting to inflammatory cytokines. Diphyllobothriosis is considered as the most important fish-borne zoonosis with up to 20 million individuals infected.

D. latum causes vitamin B_{12} deficiency in humans leading to megaloblastic or pernicious anemia. The worm absorbs around 80% of dietary B_{12} and prolonged infection can also cause abdominal pain, mechanical obstruction, and symptoms of iron-deficiency anemia. Patients with prolonged infection of D. latum should be offered B_{12} supplementation along with antiparasitics such as niclosamide or praziquantel.

Diphyllobothriosis is mainly transmitted through the consumption of raw or undercooked fish, a common element in many traditional dishes worldwide. In Europe, it’s linked to foods like raw or marinated fish in Scandinavian and Baltic cuisines, Italian carpaccio, French preparations using lake fish, and Jewish gefilte fish. In Latin America, ceviche—fish marinated in lemon juice and salt—is a known risk. Japanese cuisine, especially sushi and sashimi made with fish like ayu and cherry trout, also contributes to exposure. The global rise in popularity of such dishes has led to an increase in fish-borne parasitic infections. Occupational exposure is another factor, particularly for fishermen who eat fresh roe or liver and cooks who taste raw fish during preparation. While salmon is the most common source, other fish such as whitefish, trout, and pike are also capable of transmitting the parasite.

=== Signs and symptoms ===
Though rarely life-threatening, those affected may come across symptoms typically in the digestive tract such as diarrhea, abdominal pain or discomfort, and obstruction of the intestines which is not as common. Patients may also present a vitamin B_{12} deficiency when affected.

== See also ==
- List of parasites (human)
