= Bothria =

Bothria may refer to:

- bothria, plural of bothrium, an anatomical feature of the scolex of certain kinds of tapeworm.
- Bothria (fly), a genus of flies in the family Tachinidae
