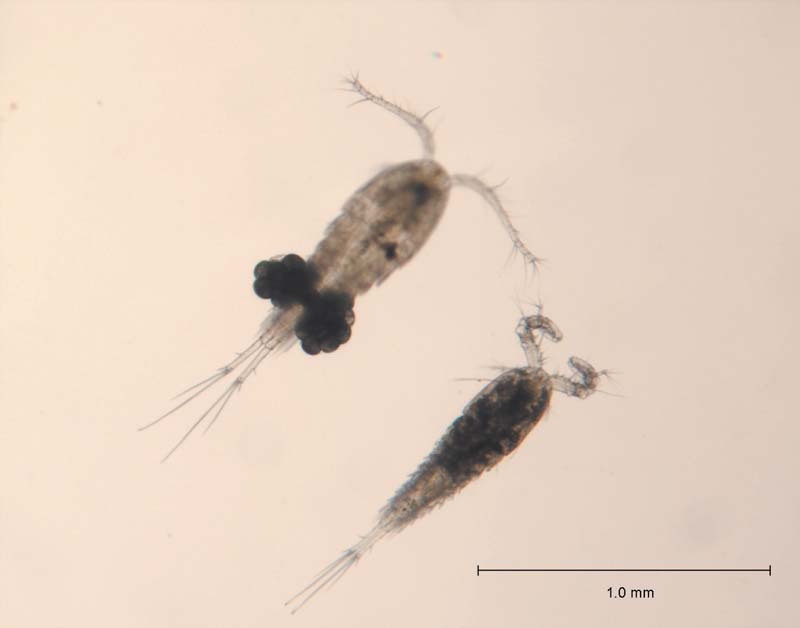
- Female (left) & male (right) C. b. thomasi

Scientific classification
- Kingdom: Animalia
- Phylum: Arthropoda
- Clade: Pancrustacea
- Class: Copepoda
- Order: Cyclopoida
- Family: Cyclopidae
- Genus: Cyclops
- Species: C. bicuspidatus

Binomial name
- Cyclops bicuspidatus Claus, 1857

Subspecies
- C. b. bicuspidatus Claus, 1857; C. b. jurinei Mahoon Najam-un-Nisa & Irfan Khan, 1987; C. b. lubbocki Brady, 1868; C. b. navus Herrick, 1882; C. b. odessanus Shmankevich, 1875; C. b. synarthrus Lowndes, 1926; C. b. thomasi S. A. Forbes, 1882

Synonyms
- Diacyclops bicuspidatus (Claus, 1857)

= Cyclops bicuspidatus =

Species of crustacean

Cyclops bicuspidatus -- now considered a member of the genus Diacyclops—is a species of copepod found throughout the world, except Australia, but relatively rare in North America; it inhabits small perennial and ephemeral ponds and wetlands. Because of earlier taxonomic changes, in North America D. bicuspidatus has been confused with the primarily planktonic Diacyclops thomasi (S.A. Forbes, 1882) and with the primarily benthic D. navus (Herrick, 1882) which were formerly considered as subspecies of D. bicuspidatus but are now considered as separate species. D. thomasi occurs from Alaska to Texas and is characteristic of the Laurentian Great Lakes of North America. In contrast to D. bicuspidatus, D. thomasi is a winter or cold water species found throughout the year in the Laurentian Great Lakes with peak abundance occurring in May or June. Males grow up to 0.8–1.0 millimetre (0.031–0.039 in) long, while females are larger at 0.9–1.6 mm (0.035–0.063 in). In North America, D. bicuspidatus has been reported from Canada and the United States as far south as Louisiana whereas D. thomasi has been reported from Alaska and Canada as far south as Morelos Mexico.

== Distribution and classification ==
D. bicuspidatus has a cosmopolitan distribution, although several of its subspecies are more restricted, possibly representing cryptic species. For example, most specimens from North America can be ascribed to D. b. thomasi (= Diacyclops thomasi), while D. b. limnoria is restricted to Lake Constance. Taxonomy within the group is uncertain, and some subspecies may even belong to different genera.

== Ecology ==
In the Great Lakes, D. thomasi is herbivorous until the fourth instar and omnivorous thereafter. Its prey includes ciliates, rotifers, small cladocerans, young copepods and fish larvae. In turn, D. thomasi is eaten by fish including the alewife, bass, bloaters, ciscoes, carpsuckers, perch, sculpin, shiners, whitefish and walleyes. In Lake Ontario, the population of D. thomasi declined significantly after the invasive cladoceran Cercopagis pengoi was introduced.
