= Cyclops varius =

Scientific classification
- Domain: Eukaryota
- Kingdom: Animalia
- Phylum: Arthropoda
- Class: Copepoda
- Order: Cyclopoida
- Family: Cyclopidae
- Genus: Cyclops
- Species: C. varius

Binomial name
- Cyclops varius Lilljeborg, 1901

Species of crustacean

Cyclops varius is a species of copepod from the Cyclopidae family. The scientific name of this species was first published in 1901 by Lilljeborg
