= Sparganosis =

Parasitic infection

- Specialty: Infectious diseases

Sparganosis is a parasitic infection caused by the plerocercoid larvae of the genus Spirometra including S. mansoni, S. ranarum, S. mansonoides and S. erinacei. It was first described by Patrick Manson in 1882, and the first human case was reported by Charles Wardell Stiles from Florida in 1908. The infection is transmitted by ingestion of contaminated water, ingestion of a second intermediate host such as a frog or snake, or contact between a second intermediate host and an open wound or mucous membrane. Humans are the accidental hosts in the life cycle, while dogs, cats, and other mammals are definitive hosts. Copepods (freshwater crustaceans) are the first intermediate hosts, and various amphibians and reptiles are second intermediate hosts.

Once a human becomes infected, the plerocercoid larvae migrate to a subcutaneous location, where they typically develop into a painful nodule. Migration to the brain results in cerebral sparganosis, while migration to the eyes results in ocular sparganosis. Sparganosis is most prevalent in Eastern Asia, although cases have been described in countries throughout the world. In total, approximately 300 cases have been described in the literature up to 2003. Diagnosis is typically not made until the sparganum larva has been surgically removed. Praziquantel is the drug of choice, although its efficacy is unknown and surgical removal of the sparganum is generally the best treatment. Public health interventions should focus on water and dietary sanitation, as well as education about the disease in rural areas and discouragement of the use of poultices.

== Symptoms ==
Clinical presentation of sparganosis most often occurs after the larvae have migrated to a subcutaneous location. The destination of the larvae is often a tissue or muscle in the chest, abdominal wall, extremities, or scrotum, although other sites include the eyes, brain, urinary tract, pleura, pericardium, and spinal canal. The early stages of disease in humans are often asymptomatic, but the spargana typically cause a painful inflammatory reaction in the tissues surrounding the subcutaneous site as they grow. Discrete subcutaneous nodules develop that may appear and disappear over a period of time. The nodules usually itch, swell, turn red, and migrate, and are often accompanied by painful edema. Seizures, hemiparesis, and headaches are also common symptoms of sparganosis, especially cerebral sparganosis, and eosinophilia is a common sign. Clinical symptoms also vary according to the location of the sparganum; possible symptoms include elephantiasis from location in the lymph channels, peritonitis from location in the intestinal perforation, and brain abscesses from location in the brain. In genital sparganosis, subcutaneous nodules are present in the groin, labia, or scrotum and may appear tumor-like.

Ocular sparganosis a particularly well-described type of sparganosis. Early signs of the ocular form include eye pain, epiphora (excessive watering of the eye), and/or ptosis (drooping of the upper eyelid). Other signs include periorbital edema and/or edematous swelling that resembles Romana's sign in Chagas disease, lacrimation, orbital cellulitis, exophthalmos (protrusion of the eyeball), and/or an exposed cornea ulcer. The most common sign at presentation is a mass lesion in the eye. If untreated, ocular sparganosis can lead to blindness.

In one case of brain infestation by Spirometra erinaceieuropaei, a man sought treatment for headaches, seizures, memory flashbacks and strange smells. Magnetic resonance imaging (MRI) scans showed a cluster of rings, initially in the right medial temporal lobe, but moving over time to the other side of the brain. The cause was not determined for four years; ultimately a biopsy was performed and a 1 cm-long tapeworm was found and removed. The patient continued to have symptoms.

== Transmission ==
The parasite is transmitted to humans in three different ways. First, humans may acquire the infection by drinking water that is contaminated with copepods housing Spirometra larvae. Second, humans may acquire the infection by consuming the raw flesh of one of the second intermediate hosts, such as frogs or snakes. For example, humans consume raw snakes or tadpoles for medicinal purposes in some Asian cultures; if the snakes or tadpoles are infected, the larvae may be transmitted to humans. Third, humans may acquire the infection by placing raw poultices of the second intermediate hosts on open wounds, lesions, or the eyes for medicinal or ritualistic reasons. If the poultice is infected with plerocercoid larvae, the human may become infected. According to Zunt et al., human infection most often occurs following ingestion of infected raw snake, frog, or pig, although contact with infected flesh of an intermediate host can also cause infection. The high prevalence in Korea may be explained by the ingestion of dog meat. In the Western hemisphere, the most common cause of infection is drinking contaminated water.

== Hosts, reservoirs, and vectors ==
Definitive hosts of Spirometra include dogs, cats, birds, and wild carnivores, while humans are accidental hosts. First intermediate hosts include copepods and other fresh-water crustaceans, while second intermediate hosts include birds, reptiles, and amphibians. The intermediate hosts are also the reservoirs of Spirometra. There are no vectors of Spirometra.

== Incubation period ==
The incubation period of Spirometra is 20 days to 3 years.

== Morphology ==
The sparganum larvae are white, wrinkled, and ribbon-shaped. They range from a few millimeters in length to several centimeters. The anterior end can invaginate and bears suggestions of the sucking grooves that are present in the scolex of the mature worm. The absence of a scolex or protoscolex in Spirometra is a key difference in differentiating between Taenia solium and Spirometra. The worm's body is also characterized by a stromal network of smooth muscle. In general, plerocercoids in the East (S. mansoni) are described as larger and more delicate than those in the West.

The eggs of S. mansonoides provide an example of the general morphological characteristics of Spirometra eggs. S. mansonoides eggs resemble the eggs of D. latum, with some specific differences. S. mansonoides eggs measure 57-66 μm by 33-37 μm, which is smaller than the eggs of D. latum. The eggs of S. mansonoides are also ellipsoidal and have a conical, prominent operculum.

== Life cycle ==
The adult Spirometra live in the small intestine of the definitive host—a dog, cat, raccoon, or other mammal—for up to 9 years, where they produce many eggs. When the host defecates, the unembryonated eggs leave the body in the feces and hatch when they reach fresh water. The eggs are eaten by copepods (crustaceans of the genus Cyclops), which are the first intermediate hosts. In the copepods, the eggs develop into procercoid larvae that live in the body cavity. The second intermediate hosts include fish, reptiles, or amphibians that consume the copepods. The larvae penetrate the intestinal tract of the second intermediate host, where they become plerocercoid larvae and proliferate to the subcutaneous tissues and muscles. The second intermediate host is eventually eaten by a definitive host predator, such as a dog, and the cycle begins again. Humans are accidental hosts in the cycle, becoming infected with the plerocercoid larvae by contact with or ingestion of the first or second intermediate hosts. The larvae migrate to the subcutaneous tissues in humans; however, no development takes place and the human is not capable of transmitting the disease. In S. proliferum, many larvae, rather than just a few, proliferate throughout the subcutaneous tissues of humans.

== Diagnosis ==
Sparganosis is typically diagnosed following surgical removal of the worms, although the infection may also be diagnosed by identification of eosinophilia or identification of the parasite in a tissue specimen. If such biopsy and excision procedures are not feasible, the antisparganum ELISA test may be used. In theory, a pre-operative diagnosis could be made by identification of exposure history and a painful, migratory, subcutaneous nodule. Sparganosis usually presents as a single nodule, while other cestode infections such as cysticercosis typically present as multiple nodules. Preoperative diagnosis, however, is rare.

CT and MRI scans are especially useful for diagnosis of cerebral sparganosis, as they reveal lesions in the brain. Through a retrospective analysis of 25 cases of cerebral sparganosis from 2000 to 2006, Song et al. found a number of characteristic signs that could be used in the future to diagnose cerebral sparganosis without performing an excision or tissue biopsy. The most characteristic finding was the "tunnel sign" on MRI images, showing the migrating track of the worm, while the most common finding was multiple conglomerated ring-shaped enhancements, seen as bead-shaped, usually with 3 to 6 rings. These findings led Song et al. to suggest that clinical history, ELISA, and either MRI or CT scans could be sufficient to make a sparganosis diagnosis. These lesions, however, are sometimes mistaken for tuberculosis lesions. In one case cerebral sparganosis was not diagnosed for four years, during which scans showed a cluster of rings moving from the right to the left side of the brain; ultimately the worm was found on biopsy.

== Prevention ==
Because sparganosis is a rare infection, public health strategies have not made its prevention a priority. Public health strategies focusing on providing basic access to clean water may help to reduce future sparganosis infections. In their retrospective study of 25 cases of cerebral sparganosis, Song et al. found that 12 patients (48%) had eaten raw or uncooked frog or snake that was infected with sparganum, 5 patients (20%) had applied an animal's flesh as a poultice to an open wound, 4 patients had drunk contaminated water, and the cause of infection was not known for 4 patients. As a result of these findings, Song et al. conclude that health education about sparganosis and the importance of food sanitation should be implemented in all rural endemic areas. It has been recommended that water consumed in endemic areas should be boiled or treated to prevent ingestion of Cyclops or Spirometra larvae. Especially in areas where ponds or ditches provide potential habitats for infected copepods, public health strategies should include education campaigns about how to identify drinking water that could potentially be infected. Strategies should warn people against ingesting the raw flesh of the intermediate hosts, such as snakes and frogs, and against using them as poultices.

== Management ==
One treatment for sparganosis is praziquantel, administered at a dose of 120 to 150 mg/kg body weight over 2 days; however, praziquantel has had limited success. In general, infestation by one or a few sparganum larvae is often best treated by surgical removal.

DNA analysis of rare worms removed surgically can provide genome information to identify and characterise each parasite; treatments for the more common tapeworms can be cross-checked to see whether they are also likely to be effective against the species in question.

== Epidemiology ==
Sparganosis is endemic or potentially endemic in 48 countries, and although rare, cases have been described in Asia, Africa, Australia, South America, and the United States. The majority of cases occur in Southeast Asia and Eastern Africa. Ocular sparganosis is especially prevalent in China and Vietnam. The highest numbers of cases occur in Korea and Japan. As of 2003, only seven cases of sparganosis had ever been described in Europe.

== History of discovery ==
Diesing first named the Sparganum genus of cestodes in 1854. Patrick Manson first reported sparganosis and the species Sparganum mansoni in China in 1882, while making the post-mortem examination of a man in Amoy, China. The first case of sparganosis in the United States was reported by Stiles in 1908; this was a case of infection by Spirometra proliferum. Mueller first described Spirometra mansonoides in the United States in 1935.
