= Bothrium =

Attaching organs of cestodes

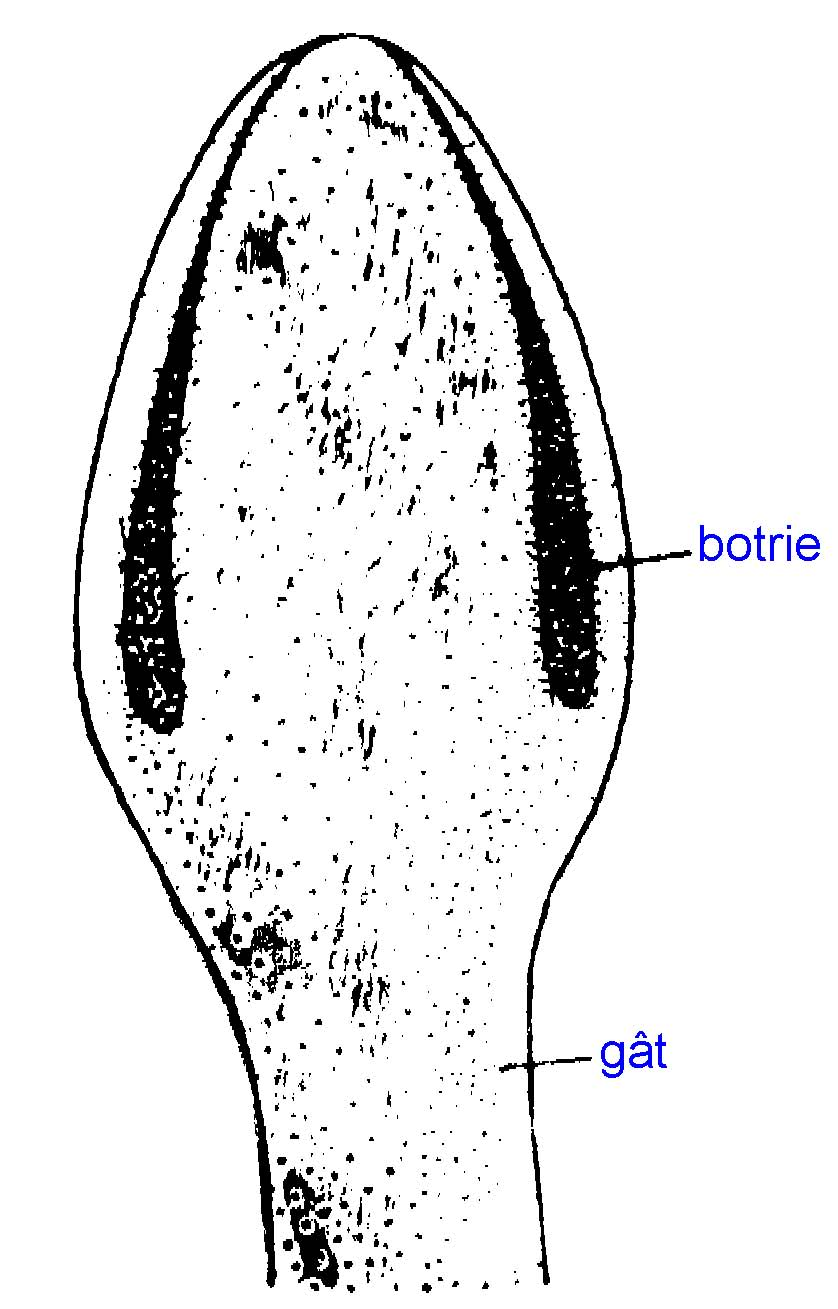
Bothrium

Bothria (from Greek bothrion = small pit, diminutive of bothros = pit, trench) are elongate, dorsal or ventral longitudinal grooves on the scolex of cestoda. They have weak muscles but are capable of some sucking action. Bothria occur as a single or two pair and are typical of the order Pseudophyllidea (e.g., Diphyllobothrium).

Bothria are muscular grooves that provide attachment by pinching host tissue between them.
