= Cyclops elegans =

Scientific classification
- Domain: Eukaryota
- Kingdom: Animalia
- Phylum: Arthropoda
- Class: Copepoda
- Order: Cyclopoida
- Family: Cyclopidae
- Genus: Cyclops
- Species: C. elegans

Binomial name
- Cyclops elegans Herrick, 1884

Species of crustacean

Cyclops elegans is a freshwater copepod species in the genus Cyclops.
