= Parasite load =

Number and virulence of the parasites that a host organism harbours

Parasite load is a measure of the number and virulence of the parasites that a host organism harbours. Quantitative parasitology deals with measures to quantify parasite loads in samples of hosts and to make statistical comparisons of parasitism across host samples.

In evolutionary biology, parasite load has important implications for sexual selection and the evolution of sex, as well as openness to experience.

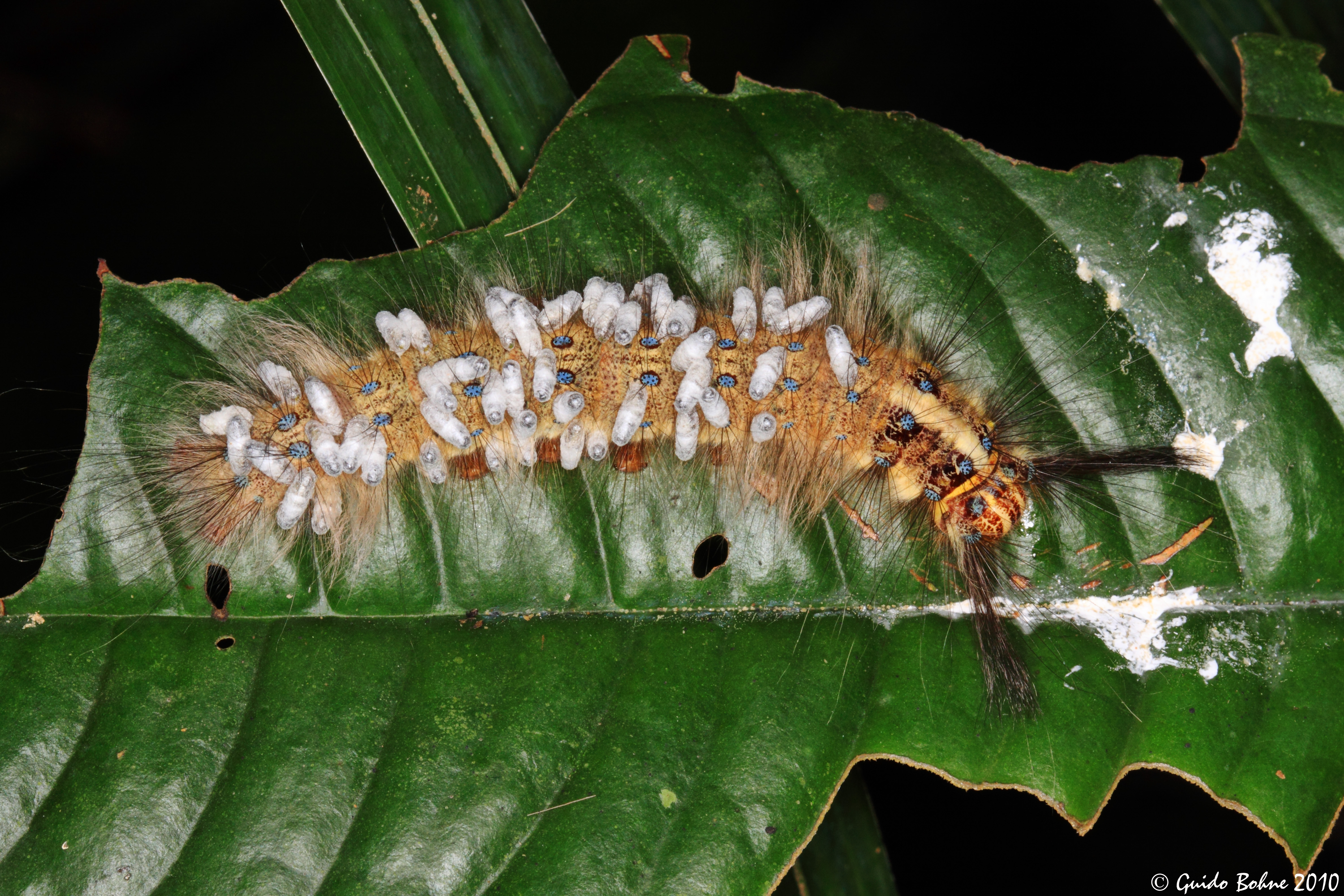
High parasite load. Lappet moth caterpillar parasited by braconid wasps.

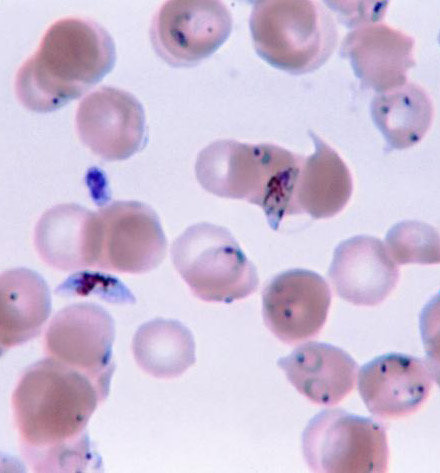
Enumeration of Plasmodium parasites (blue) in human red blood cells (pink) to quantify relative parasite load.

== Infection and distribution ==
A single parasite species usually has an aggregated distribution across host individuals, which means that most hosts harbor few parasites, while a few hosts carry the vast majority of parasite individuals. This poses considerable problems for students of parasite ecology: use of parametric statistics should be avoided. Log-transformation of data before the application of parametric test, or the use of non-parametric statistics is often recommended. However, this can give rise to further problems. Therefore, modern day quantitative parasitology is based on more advanced biostatistical methods.

In vertebrates, males frequently carry higher parasite loads than females. Differences in movement patterns, habitat choice, diet, body size, and ornamentation are all thought to contribute to this sex bias observed in parasite loads. Often males have larger habitat ranges and thus are likely to encounter more parasite-dense areas than female conspecifics. Whenever sexual dimorphism is exhibited in species, the larger sex is thought to tolerate higher parasite loads.

In insects, susceptibility to parasite load has been linked to genetic variation in the insect colony. In colonies of Hymenoptera (ants, bees and wasps), colonies with high genetic variation that were exposed to parasites experienced lesser parasite loads than colonies that are more genetically similar.

== Methods of quantifying ==
Depending on the parasitic species in question, various methods of quantification allow scientists to measure the numbers of parasites present and determine the parasite load of an organism. Quantifying the parasite depends on what type of parasite is in question as well as where it resides in the host body. For example, intracellular parasites such as the protozoan genus Plasmodium which causes malaria in humans, are quantified through performing a blood smear and counting the number of white blood cells infected by viewing the smear through a microscope. Other parasites residing in the blood of a host could be similarly counted on a blood smear using specific staining methods to better visualize the cells. As technology advances, more modernized methods of parasite quantification are emerging such as hand held automated cell counters, in order to efficiently count parasites such as Plasmodium in blood smears.

Quantifying intestinal parasites, such as nematodes present in an individual, often it requires dissection of the animal, extraction and counting of the parasites. Other techniques to determine intestinal parasites exist which do not require dissection; such as detection of parasitic infections by fecal examination. This is a common practice in veterinary medicine and is used to calculate parasite load in domestic animals, such as cats and dogs. Methods of fecal examination include fecal smears and flotation methods. Fecal floats can detect reproductive means of endoparasitic (see endoparasite) organisms (eggs, larvae, oocysts, and cysts) that are passed through the digestive system and are therefore present in the feces.

For analytical statistical methods used to study the extent and intensity of parasitic infection see Quantitative parasitology.

== Effects ==
=== Sexual selection ===
Parasite load has been known to affect sexual selection in various species. Hamilton and Zuk (1982) suggested that females of species could base their choice of mates on heritable resistance to parasites. This hypothesis proposes that the expression of secondary sex characteristics depends on the hosts overall health. Hosts coevolve with parasites and thus generate heritable resistance to parasites, which have a net negative effect on host viability. Therefore, females will select males with few or no parasites by basing their choice on whether or not the male has fully expressed secondary sexual, otherwise known as 'healthy' characteristics.

One study found that parasite load predicts mate choice in guppies. When controlling for other variables, females were shown to prefer males with relatively few parasites with this preference being associated with higher display rates that occur in less parasitized males. This phenomenon has also been observed in other species.

=== Behaviour ===
Parasite load has also been shown to affect the behavior of the infected individual. Numerous studies have been done looking at the effects of number of parasites present in a host and how this correlates with behaviors such as foraging, migration, and competitive behavior. In a study performed at the University of Georgia, it was found that beetles with higher parasite loads won more fights than those with lower parasitic loads. When put up against beetles with no parasites present, the parasite-laden beetles lost the fights.

Bird species have also exhibited behavioural effects in relation to parasite load. In passerine songbirds, high parasite load results in reduced song outputs, affecting the output of secondary sexual characteristics that influence mate selection. Similar effects have been observed in other bird species.

== In medicine ==
Parasite load has been shown to affect the spread of infectious diseases. For example, parasitologists at the Universidade de São Paulo researched the effect of Chagas disease on the immune system. They found that individuals who survived the acute phase of infection develop parasite-specific immune response that reduces parasite levels in tissues and blood. This research aims to discover if the parasite load during the acute stage of infection affects if the host will eventually have a positive immune response. The research was conducted on mice, with the intention of eventually using the information gleaned from the experiments to assist humans who have contracted Chaga's disease. Marinho et al. found that parasite loads in the acute phase of infection correlates at the late chronic stage of the disease, with the intensity of the activation and response of the immune system of the host. This research could lead to new discoveries in parasitology. This could potentially prevent the spread of parasites and therefore diseases linked to parasite infection within a given population.

== Host stress ==
Host stress causes conditions within the host to be less than ideal for parasites, leading to and causing parasite load. Malnutrition has been shown to suppress the immune system, leading to higher parasite loads within a population and increased transmission rates throughout the population. It has been shown that malnutrition, and putrefaction can lead to illness within a population and therefore increase the amount of parasites within a population. Those individuals that are malnourished and stressed exhibit the highest numbers of parasite load. This implies that these individuals have a higher likelihood of dying due to the environmental factors, as well as parasite infection, likely killing the population of parasites within that specific host. This would then limit the propagation of the parasites within the population.

In the experiment conducted by Pulkkinen et al. it was found that when food was limited in a population of crabs infected with daphnia, there were mortalities among the infected population of crabs. This was due to stress within environment, as well as stress within the host (crab body) from parasite infection. Pulkkinen et al. also found that after a period of time there was a corresponding reduction in average size of crabs, and therefore the mortality rate due to malnutrition and environmental stress was reduced. This increased the parasite load within the population. Parasite load is a complex ecological phenomenon, often exhibiting a negative feedback loop, as it is within the interest of the parasite population for the host to survive infection.
