= Spirometra =

Scientific classification
- Kingdom: Animalia
- Phylum: Platyhelminthes
- Class: Cestoda
- Order: Diphyllobothriidea
- Family: Diphyllobothriidae
- Genus: Spirometra

Species
- S. asiana Yamasaki, Sugiyama & Morishima, 2023; S. bresslaui (Baer, 1927); S. decipiens (Diesing, 1850); S. erinaceieuropaei (Rudolphi, 1819) Faust, Campbell & Kellogg, 1929; S. folium (Diesing, 1850); S. gracilis (Baer, 1927); S. janickii Furmaga, 1953; S. longicollis (Parodi & Widakowich, 1917); S. mansoni (Cobbold, 1883) Faust, Campbell & Kellogg, 1929; S. mansonoides (Mueller, 1935); S. okumari (Faust, Campbell & Kellogg, 1929); S. pretoriensis (Baer, 1924) Wardle, McLeod & Stewart, 1947; S. ranarum (Gastaldi, 1854); S. reptans (Diesing, 1850); S. theileri (Baer, 1924) Opuni & Muller, 1974; S. urichi (Cameron, 1936) Mueller, 1938

Genus of tapeworms

Spirometra is a genus of pseudophyllid cestodes that reproduce in canines and felines, but can also cause pathology in humans if infected. As an adult, this tapeworm lives in the small intestine of its definitive host and produces eggs that pass with the animal's feces. When the eggs reach water, the eggs hatch into coracidia which are eaten by copepods. The copepods are eaten by a second intermediate host to continue the life cycle. Humans can become infected if they accidentally eat frog legs or fish with the plerocercoid stage encysted in the muscle. In humans, an infection of Spirometra is termed sparganosis.

== History ==
Spirometra infections were first described by Patrick Manson from China in 1882, and the first human case was reported by Charles Wardell Stiles from Florida in 1908. Among this family of flatworms, there are a few species that show up most prominently in infections. One of these species is Spirometra erinaceieuropaei, which is the main cause of infections in Europe and Asia, and rarely but sometimes in North and South America. The species that is the leading cause of infections in the Americas is Spirometra mansonoides. Some other species of Spirometra that have been diagnosed as causing infections are Spirometra felis, Spirometra decipiens, and Spirometra urichi. The species Spirometra felis was found in domestic cats, as well as Spirometra decipiens. This same species, (Spirometra decipiens) was also discovered when scientists fed dogs larvae from frogs. Spirometra decipiens has been identified in cats, dogs, and leopards. Finally, Spirometra urichi was identified through an infection of an ocelot in Trinidad.

== Life cycle ==
The adult worm of Spirometra species live in the small intestine of the definitive host—a dog, cat, raccoon, or other mammal—for up to nine years, where they produce many eggs. When the host defecates, the eggs leave the body in the feces and hatch when they reach fresh water. The eggs are then eaten by copepods, which are considered the first intermediate hosts. In the copepods, the eggs develop into procercoid larvae that live in the body cavity of the copepod until the life cycle can continue. The second intermediate hosts include fish, reptiles, or amphibians that consume the copepods while drinking water. The larvae penetrate the intestinal tract of the second intermediate host, where they develop into the plerocercoid larvae and migrate and encyst into the subcutaneous tissues and muscles. After this step in the life cycle, the second intermediate host can get eaten by a larger fish or animal, but the plerocercoid larvae will not develop to a further developmental stage and will just re-encysts into the subcutaneous tissues and muscles of this new host. If this additional second intermediate host does not get eaten by a paratenic host, then the second intermediate host will eventually get eaten by a definitive host predator, typically a cat, and the cycle begins again. Humans are accidental hosts in the cycle, becoming infected with the plerocercoid larvae by ingestion of the first or second intermediate hosts. The larvae migrate to the subcutaneous tissues in humans; however, no further development takes place and the human is not capable of transmitting the disease.

== Pathology ==
The pathology of a Spirometra infection depends on the ending location of the migrating sparganum. The adult stage typically causes little to no pathology in the host. In paratenic hosts, plerocercoids migrate mainly to subcutaneous tissues from the small intestine, causing pain, edema, and inflammation. Sparganosis usually appears as slowly growing migratory subcutaneous nodules in the tissues of infected intermediate and paratenic hosts. The parasite can be found anywhere in the body including central nervous system. Few humans have died from this kind of infection, called sparganosis. For more information about the symptoms and pathology associated with sparganosis, see the disease page of sparganosis.

== Diagnosis ==
To diagnose a Spirometra infection in humans, a serodiagnosis ELISA can be used to target anti-sparganum IgG antibodies within the blood. This diagnostic method is useful around 10–12 days post infection and is almost 100% effective at detecting the anti-sparganum antibodies in the 14–22 days post infection. Serodiagnosis of sparganosis is a useful early detection method. Another method of diagnosing sparganosis is a biopsy of a subcutaneous sample. An early detection sera detects the cysteine protease of some species of Spirometra excretory-secretory proteins. This option proves to be the best choice for early diagnostic methods in regards to early antigen identification. Some imaging methods such as CT or MRI scans can be used to identify spargana larvae in other areas of the body, like the brain.

When diagnosing an infection in animals, proglottids from the worm itself may have broken off and ended up in the feces along with eggs. The proglottids can be microscopically identified as being in the Order of Pseudophyllidea because they have medial genital pores, but the actual genus of the worm could not be specifically identified from proglottids alone. The specificity of the worm genus or species would require differentiation based upon the uterus and egg morphology.

== Treatment and prevention ==
The best way to treat this condition in humans is with surgery, as most drug treatments are unsuccessful at getting rid of the larval stages.

In animals, infections with Spirometra species can be treated with praziquantel at 30-35 mg/kg, PO of SQ, for 2 consecutive days. Mebendazole at 11 mg/kg, PO, has also been successful. Taking an infected animal to a vet is the best option for ridding a pet of any developmental stage.

Infection of humans may be prevented by avoiding eating under-cooked frog or fish, and avoiding drinking infected water.
