= Phenotype modification =

Phenotype modification is the process of experimentally altering an organism's phenotype to investigate the impact of phenotype on the fitness.

Phenotype modification has been used to assess the impact of parasite mechanical presence on fish host behaviour.
