= Ligula (flatworm) =

Scientific classification
- Kingdom: Animalia
- Phylum: Platyhelminthes
- Class: Cestoda
- Order: Diphyllobothriidea
- Family: Diphyllobothriidae
- Genus: Ligula; Bloch, 1782

Synonyms
- Braunia Leon, 1908; Diagramma Fuhrmann, 1928; Digramma Cholodkovsky, 1914; Legula Huber, 1896; Leguli Stiles & Tayler, 1902; Lingula Latreille, 1804

Genus of flatworms

Ligula is a genus of flatworm.

There are ten species assigned to this genus:

- Ligula alternans Rudolphi, 1810
- Ligula avium Bloch, 1782
- Ligula colymbi Zeder, 1803
- Ligula digramma Creplin, 1839
- Ligula interrupta Rudolphi, 1810
- Ligula intestinalis (Linnaeus, 1758) Gmelin, 1790
- Ligula monogramma Creplin, 1839
- Ligula nemachili (Dubinina, 1957) Kuchta & Scholz, 2017
- Ligula pancerii Polonio, 1860
- Ligula pavlovskii Dubinina, 1959
