= Plerocercoid =

Larval tapeworm

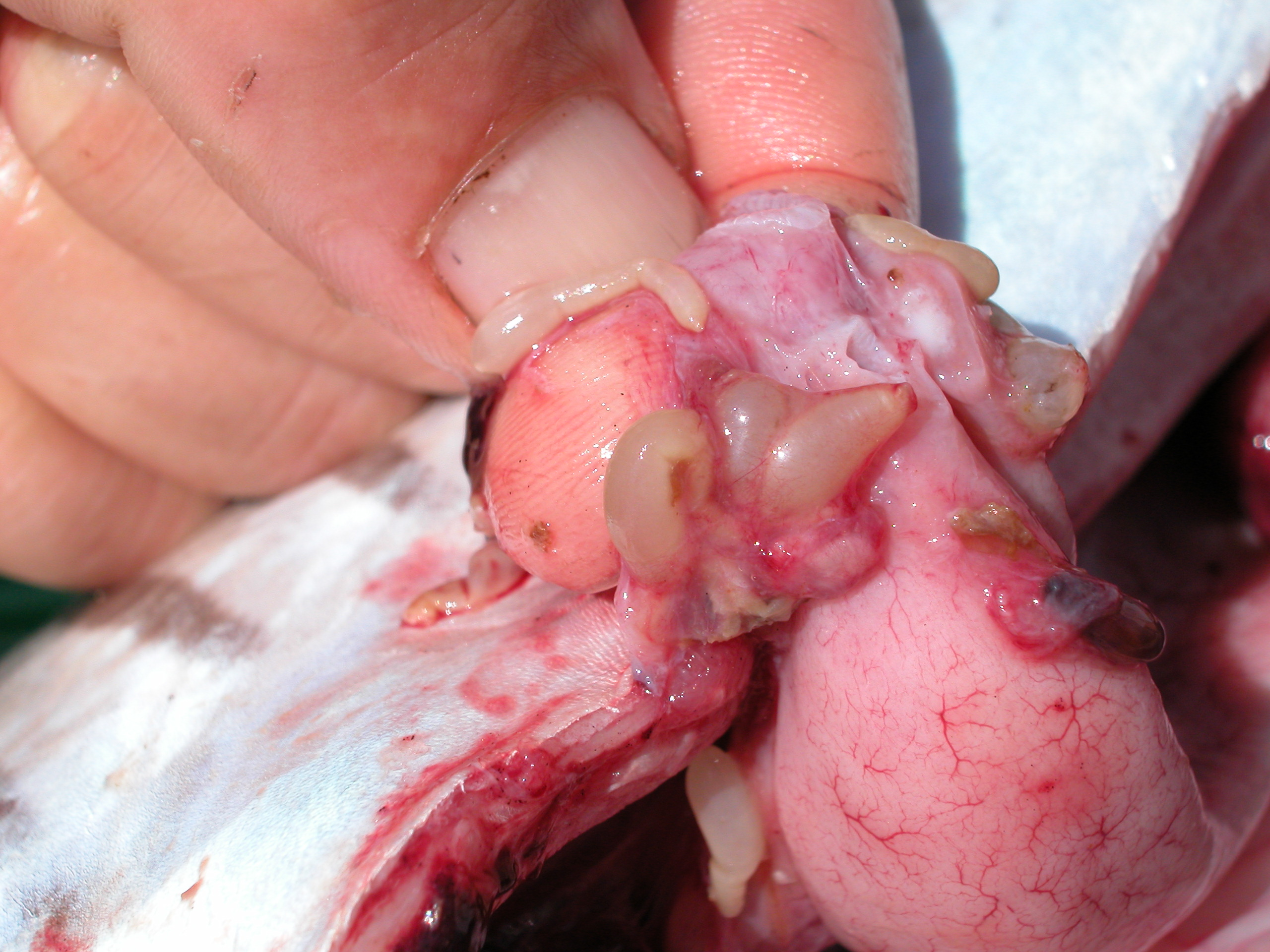
Plerocerci of Callitetrarhynchus gracilis in the body cavity of the fish Scomberomorus commerson

Plerocercoid is the last larval form, the infective form, found in the second intermediate host of many Cestoda with aquatic life cycles.
