= Procercoid =

Larval stage of Cestoda

The procercoid is the second larval stage of some tapeworms, which typically develops inside of copepods following their ingestion of the coracidium parasite structure that contains the larval oncosphere. The flatworm in this stage is not enclosed in a protective cyst, but is infectious to the next intermediate host. Procercoids resemble their adult forms in pathways of energy metabolism. They are basically anaerobic, lacking a complete Krebs cycle, and rely on glycolysis.

== See also ==
- Plerocercoid, the last larval stage
