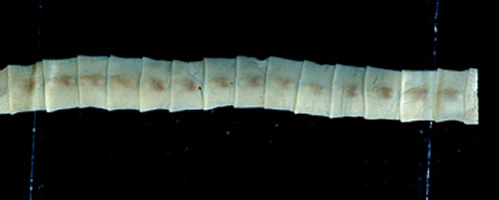
- proglottids of Diphyllobothrium latum

Scientific classification
- Kingdom: Animalia
- Phylum: Platyhelminthes
- Class: Cestoda
- Order: Diphyllobothriidea
- Family: Diphyllobothriidae; Lühe, 1910

= Diphyllobothriidae =

Family of flatworms

Diphyllobothriidae is a family of Cestoda (tapeworms). Members of this family are gut parasites of vertebrates. In most species the definitive hosts are marine or aquatic mammals such as cetaceans and pinnipeds, the first intermediate host usually being a crustacean and the second intermediate a fish. The genus Diphyllobothrium is found as an adult in mammals and fish-eating birds, including the domestic cat. The genus Spirometra tends to have a land-dwelling or semi-aquatic vertebrate as its second intermediate host, with the adults usually occurring in felines.

== Genera ==
The World Register of Marine Species lists the following genera:-

- Adenocephalus Nybelin, 1931
- Baylisia Markowski, 1952
- Baylisiella Markowski, 1952
- Dibothriocephalus Lühe, 1899
- Diphyllobothrium Cobbold, 1858
- Flexobothrium Yurakhno, 1989
- Glandicephalus Fuhrmann, 1921
- Ligula Bloch, 1782
- Multiductus Clarke, 1962
- Plicobothrium Rausch & Margolis, 1969
- Pyramicocephalus Monticelli, 1890
- Schistocephalus Creplin, 1829
- Spirometra Faust, Campbell & Kellogg, 1929
- Tetragonoporus Skryabin, 1961
