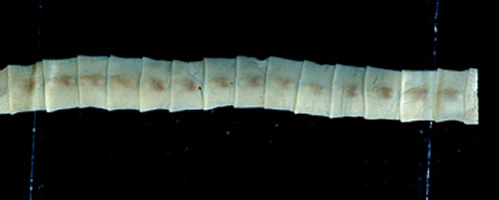
- proglottids of Diphyllobothrium latum

Scientific classification
- Kingdom: Animalia
- Phylum: Platyhelminthes
- Class: Cestoda
- Subclass: Eucestoda
- Order: Diphyllobothriidea; Kuchta, Scholz, Brabec & Bray, 2008

Families
- Cephalochlamydidae; Diphyllobothriidae; Solenophoridae

= Diphyllobothriidea =

Order of flatworms

Diphyllobothriidea is an order of Cestoda (tapeworms). Members of this order are gut parasites of vertebrates. They infect mammals as their definitive hosts and use either copepods (a group of small crustaceans found in the sea and nearly every freshwater habitat, e.g. Spirometra) or both copepods and fish as in the broadfish tapeworm as intermediate hosts.
