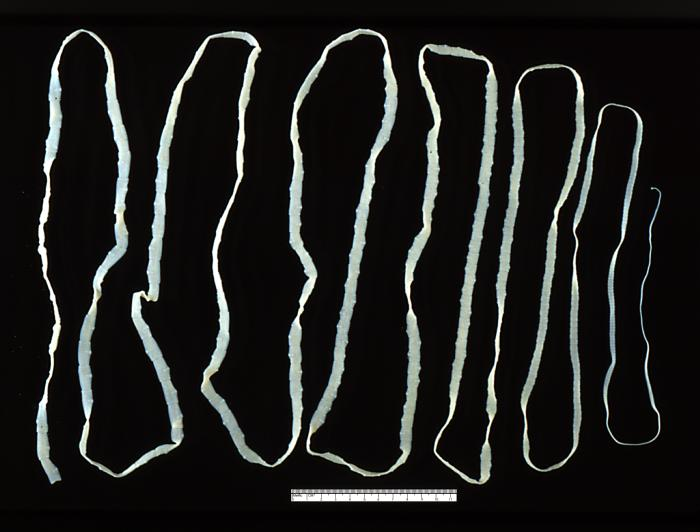
- Taenia saginata adult

Scientific classification
- Kingdom: Animalia
- Phylum: Platyhelminthes
- Class: Cestoda
- Subclass: Eucestoda

Subdivisions
- See text

= Eucestoda =

Eucestoda Temporal range: 270–0 Ma Roadian-Present Molecular analyses suggest a Late Silurian/Early Devonian origin

Subclass of flatworms

Eucestoda is the larger of the two subclasses of flatworms in the class Cestoda (the other subclass being Cestodaria) whose members are commonly known as tapeworms. Larvae have six posterior hooks on the scolex (head), in contrast to the ten-hooked Cestodaria. All tapeworms are endoparasites of vertebrates, living in the digestive tract or related ducts. Examples are the pork tapeworm (Taenia solium) with a human definitive host, and pigs as the secondary host, and Moniezia expansa, the definitive hosts of which are ruminants.

== Body structure ==
Adult Eucestoda have a white-opaque dorso-ventrally flattened appearance, and are elongated, ranging in length from a few millimeters (about 1/4") to 25 meters (80'). Almost all members, except members of the orders Caryophyllidea and Spathebothriidea, are polyzoic with repeated sets of reproductive organs down the body length, and almost all members, except members of the order Dioecocestidae, are protandral hermaphrodites. Most except caryophyllideans consist of a few to 4000 proglottids (segments) that show a characteristic body differentiation pattern into scolex (head), neck, and strobila.

The scolex, located at the anterior end, is a small (usually less than 1 mm) holdfast organ with specific systems for fastening itself to materials: rostrum, acetabula, suckers, bothria, grooves, and hooks. The small neck region, directly behind the scolex, consists of an undifferentiated tissue region of proglottid proliferation, leading into a zone of increasing and continuous proglottid differentiation. As such, the main and largest section of the body, the strobila, consists of a chain of increasingly mature proglottids. These cytological processes are not well understood at present.

Members of the Eucestoda have no mouth or digestive tract, and instead absorb nutrients through a layer of microtriches over the tegument at the shared body wall surface. In addition to the body wall, several other systems are common to the whole length of the tapeworm, including excretory canals, nerve fibers, and longitudinal muscles. The excretory system is responsible for osmoregulation and consists of blind-ending flame bulbs communicating through a duct system. The nervous system, often referred to as a "ladder system," is a system of longitudinal connectives and transverse ring commissures.

=== Reproduction ===
The reproductive systems develop progressively along the differentiated proglottids of the strobila region, with each proglottid developing one or two sets of sexual organs that differentiate at different times in a species-specific pattern, usually male-first. Thus, moving in the posterior direction of the continuously maturing proglottid chain, there are proglottids with mature male reproductive organs, then proglottids with mature female reproductive organs, and then proglottids with fertilized eggs in the uterus, a condition commonly referred to as "gravid".

=== Proglottids ===
An atrium on the lateral margin of each proglottid contains the openings to both the male and female genital ducts. Follicular testes produce sperm, which are carried by a system of ducts to the cirrus, an eversible copulatory organ that usually has a hypodermic system of spines and a holdfast system of hooks. The main specialized female reproductive organs are an ovary that produces eggs and a vitellarium that produces yolk cells. Yolk cells travel in a duct system to the oviduct, where, in a modified region, the ovum is enclosed in a shell with yolk cells. After the gonads and their ducts have finished maturing, the female reproductive organs begin to mature. The oviduct develops a vagina and enlarges into the uterus, where fertilization and embryonic development occur.

Egg formation is a result of copulation. A proglottid can copulate with itself, with other proglottids in the same worm, or with proglottids in other worms, and hypodermic fertilization sometimes occurs. When a gravid proglottid that is distended with an embryo reaches the end of the strobila, it detaches and passes out of the host intact with feces, with or without some tissue degeneration. In the order Pseudophyllidea, the uterus has a pore and the proglottid sheds the shelled embryo, only becoming detached when exhausted.

Some members of the Eucestoda (such as Echinococcus, Sparganum, Taenia multiceps sp., and Mesocestoides sp.) can reproduce asexually through budding, which initiates a metagenesis of alternating sexually and asexually reproducing generations.

== Life stages ==
A tapeworm can live from a few days to over 20 years. Eucestoda ontogenesis continues through metamorphosing in different larval stages inside different hosts. The initial six-hooked embryo, known as an oncosphere or hexacanth, forms through cleavage. In the order Pseudophyllidea, it remains enclosed in a ciliated embryophore. The embryo continues to develop in other host species, with two intermediate hosts generally needed. It gains entry to its first intermediate host by being eaten.

Except for members of the order Taeniidae, the first intermediate host is an arthropod, and except for in the case of Archigetes spp. (which can attain sexual maturity in freshwater oligochaeta), the second host is usually a fish, but can be another invertebrate or vertebrate.

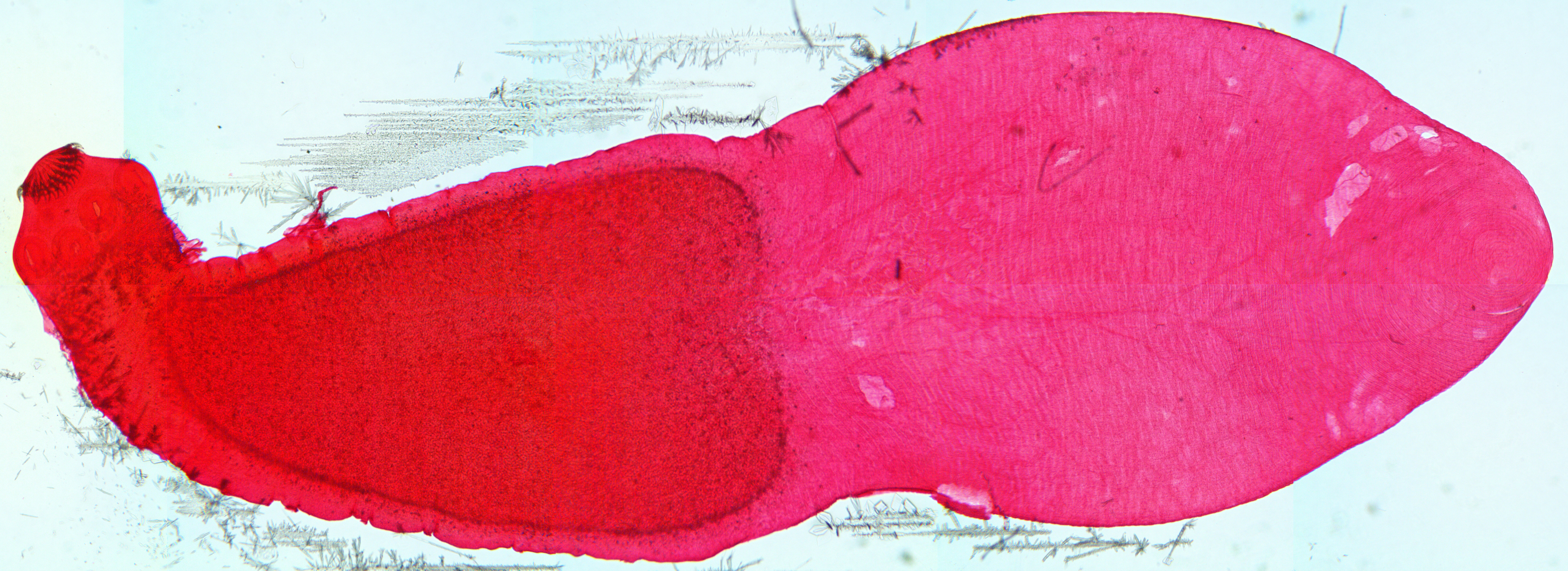
Tapeworm Taemia pisiformis Cysticercus E

After the scolex has differentiated and matured in the larval stage, growth will stop until a vertebrate eats the intermediate host, and then the strobila develops. Adult tapeworms often have a high final host specificity, with some species only found in one host vertebrate.

== Common infective species ==
Final host	Species
Humans	Diphyllobothrium latum, Spirometra erinacea euopaei, Taenia solium, T. saginata, T. asiatica, Mesocestoides leptothylacus (rarely), Rodentolepis (syn. Vampiro-, Hymenolepis) nana, Hymenolepis diminuta
Cats	Diphyllobothrium latum, Spirometra erinacea euopaei, T. pisiformis, Echinococcus multilocularis, Dipylidium caninum
Dogs	Diphyllobothrium latum, Spirometra erinacea euopaei, T. hydatigena, T. ovis, T. pisiformis, T. multiceps, T. serialis, E. granulosus, E. multilocaris, Mesocestoides leptothylacus, Dipylidium caninum
Fish	Caryophyllaeus laticeps, Glaridacris catostomi, Archigetes sieboldi, Triaenophorus sp., Eubothrium sp., Rhinobothrium sp., Phyllobothrium sp., Proteocephalus ambloplites
Fish-Eating Birds	Ligula intestinalis, Schistocephalus solidus
Rodents	Schistocephalus solidus, Rodentolepis nana, Hymenolepis diminuta
Horses	Anoplocephala magna, Anoplocephala perfoliata
Ruminants	Moniezia expans, Avitellina sp., Thysaniezia sp., Stilesia sp.
Chickens	Davainea proglottina, Raillietina tetragona, Amoebotaenia sp., Choanataenia sp., Hymenolepis carioca
Foxes	T. ovis, T. multiceps, T. serialis, E. granulosus, E. multilocularis, Mesocestoides leptothylacus, Dipylidium caninum
Lagomorphs	Cittotaenia sp.

== Medical importance ==
=== Taeniasis ===
Taeniasis is an infection within the intestines by adult tapeworms belonging to the genus Taenia. It is due to eating contaminated undercooked beef or pork. There are generally no or only mild symptoms. Symptoms may occasionally include weight loss or abdominal pain. Segments of tapeworm may be seen in the stool.

=== Cysticercosis ===
Cysticercosis is a tissue infection caused by the young form of the pork tapeworm. Infection occurs through swallowing or antiperistaltic contractions during regurgitation carrying eggs or gravid proglottids to the stomach. At this point, larvae hatch when exposed to enzymes and penetrate the intestinal wall, travelling through the body through blood vessels to tissues like the brain, the eye, muscles, and the nervous system (called neurocysticercosis).

At these sites, the parasites lodge and form cysts, a condition called cysticercosis, producing inflammatory reactions and clinical issues when they die, sometimes causing serious or fatal damage. In the eye, the parasites can cause visual loss, and infection of the spine and adjacent leptomeninges can cause paresthesias, pain, or paralysis.

=== Echinococcosis (hydatid disease) ===
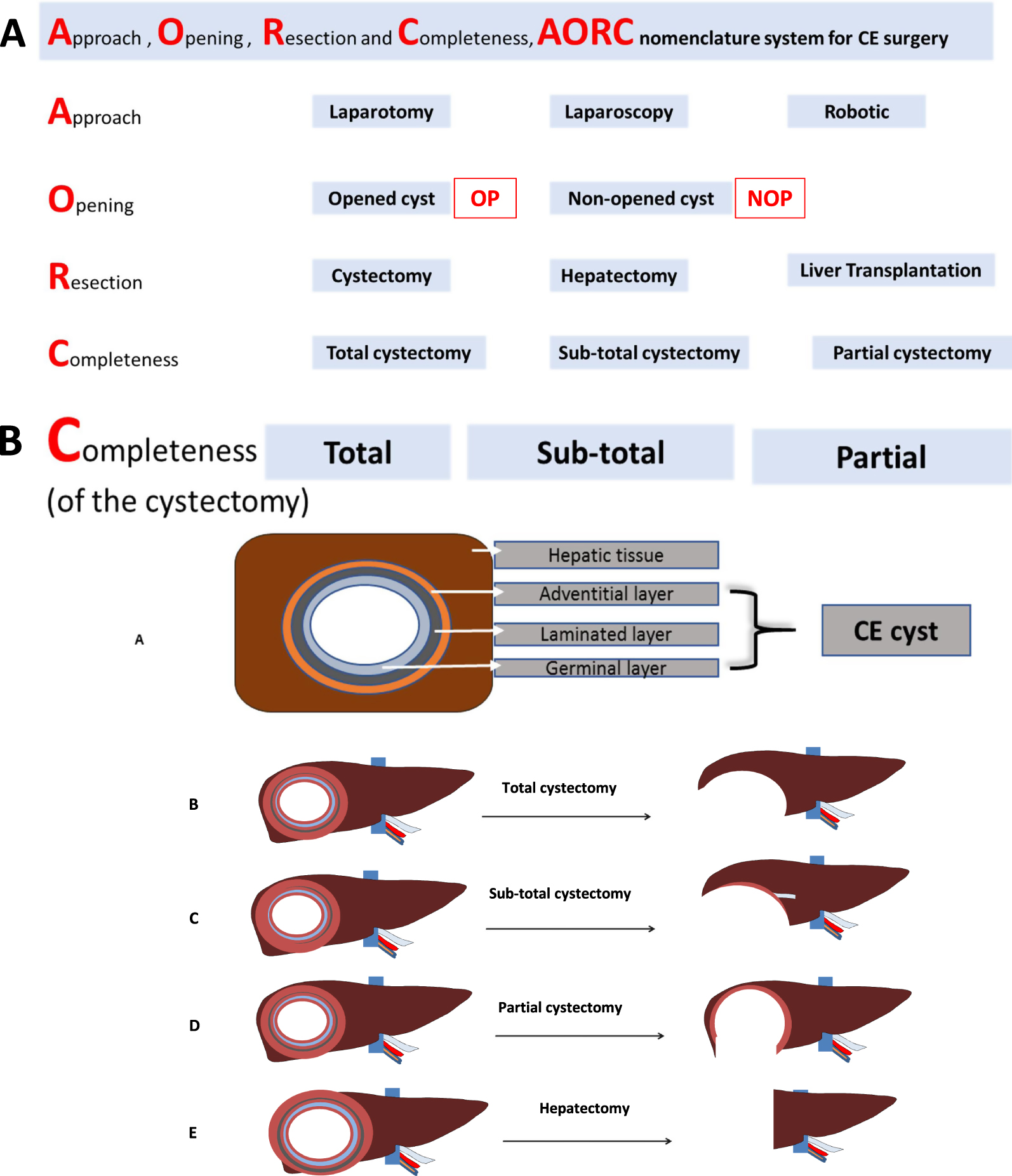
Nomenclature framework for Cystic Echinococcosis surgery

Humans become accidental hosts to worms of the genus Echinococcus, playing no role in the worm's biological cycle. This can result in echinococcosis, also called hydatid disease. Humans become infected by direct contact with dogs and eating food contaminated with dog feces. Common sites of infection are the liver, the lungs, muscles, bones, kidneys, and the spleen.

Eggs hatch in the gastrointestinal tract after the consumption of contaminated food, after which the larvae travel to the liver through portal circulation. Here, the larvae are trapped and usually develop into hydatid cysts. While the liver is the first filter for trapping them, the lungs act as the second filter site, trapping most of the larvae that are not trapped by the liver. Some larvae escape from the lungs to cause cysts in other tissues.

When a larva becomes established in tissue, it develops into a "bladderworm" or "hydatid" and can cause various cancer-like cysts that may rupture and interact with nearby organs. Most cases are asymptomatic, and the mortality rate is low, but various complications from these interactions may lead to debilitating illness.

=== Hymenolepiasis ===
Arthropods are intermediate hosts of Hymenolepis nana, otherwise known as the "dwarf tapeworm," while humans are used as final hosts. Humans become infected and develop hymenolepiasis through eating infected arthropods, ingesting eggs in water inhabited by arthropods, or from dirty hands. This is a common and widespread intestinal worm.

While light infections are usually asymptomatic, autoinfection through eating the eggs of worms in the intestines is possible, and it can lead to hyperinfection. Humans can also become hyperinfected through ingesting grain products contaminated by infected insects. Infections involving more than two thousand worms can cause many different gastrointestinal symptoms and allergic responses. Common symptoms include chronic urticaria, skin eruption, and phlyctenular keratoconjunctivitis.

=== Diphyllobothriasis ===
Diphyllobothriasis is caused by infection with Diphyllobothrium latum (also known as the "broad tapeworm" or "fish tapeworm") and related species. Humans become infected by eating raw, undercooked, or marinated fish acting as a second intermediate or paratenic host harboring metacestodes or plerocercoid larvae.

Clinical symptoms are due to the large size of the tapeworm, which often reaches a length exceeding 15 m (49 ft). The most common symptom is pernicious anemia, caused by the absorption of vitamin B_{12} by the worm. Other symptoms include various intestinal issues, slight leukocytosis, and eosinophilia.

=== Sparganosis ===
Sparganosis is caused by the plerocercoid larvae of the tapeworm Spirometra. Humans become infected by drinking contaminated water, eating raw or poorly cooked infected flesh, or from using poultices of raw infected flesh (usually raw pork or snake) on skin or mucous membranes.

The most common symptom is a painful, slowly growing nodule in the subcutaneous tissues, which may migrate. Infection in the eye area can cause pain, irritation, edema, and excess watering. When the orbital tissues become infected, the swelling can cause blindness. An infected bowel may become perforated. Brain infection can cause granulomas, hematomas, and abscesses.

== Subdivisions ==
The evolutionary history of the Eucestoda has been studied using ribosomal RNA, mitochondrial and other DNA, and morphological analysis and continues to be revised. "Tetraphyllidea" is seen to be paraphyletic; "Pseudophyllidea" has been broken up into two orders, Bothriocephalidea and Diphyllobothriidea. Hosts, whose phylogeny often mirrors that of the parasites (Fahrenholz's rule), are indicated in italics and parentheses, the life-cycle sequence (where known) shown by arrows as (intermediate host_{1} [→ intermediate host_{2}] → definitive host). Alternatives, generally for different species within an order, are shown in square brackets.

- Cestoda
  - Gyrocotylidea (fishes)
  - - - Amphilinidea (crustaceans → fishes/turtles)
      - Eucestoda tapeworms
        - Spathebothriidea (amphipods → fishes)
        - - - Caryophyllidea (annelids → fishes)
            - - Haplobothriidea (freshwater fishes → bowfin)
              - Diphyllobothriidea (copepods [→ fishes] → mammals)
          - - - Diphyllidea (elasmobranchs inc. rays, sharks)
              - Trypanorhyncha (fishes/crustaceans/molluscs → bony fishes/selachians)
            - - Bothriocephalidea (crustaceans [→ teleost] → teleost fishes/amphibians)
              - - Litobothriidea (lamniform sharks)
                - - Lecanicephalidea (molluscs → selachians)
                  - - Rhinebothriidea (stingrays)
                    - - "Tetraphyllidea" (copepods → fishes/decapods/cephalopods → selachians)
                      - - - "Tetraphyllidea"
                          - Onchoproteocephalidea (crustaceans → inverts/verts → fishes/amphibians/reptiles)
                        - - Nippotaeniidea (crustaceans → fishes)
                          - - Mesocestoididae (mammals/birds)
                            - - Tetrabothriidea (crustaceans?/cephalopods?/teleosts? → seabirds/cetaceans/pinnipeds)
                              - Cyclophyllidea (mammals → mammals, or insects → birds)
