= Anoplocephala manubriata =

Scientific classification
- Kingdom: Animalia
- Phylum: Platyhelminthes
- Class: Cestoda
- Order: Cyclophyllidea
- Family: Anoplocephalidae
- Genus: Anoplocephala
- Species: A. manubriata

Binomial name
- Anoplocephala manubriata Railliet et al., 1914

Species of flatworm

Anoplocephala manubriata is a host-specific tapeworm, or cestode, that parasitizes African (Loxodonta africana) and Asian (Elephas maximus) elephants. These parasites require intermediate and definitive hosts to complete its life cycle. A. manubriata causes gastrointestinal inflammation in elephants. When ingested in the elephant, the cestode is attached to the intestinal mucosae. The life cycle of A. manubriata have not been completely understood, however studies have shown through examining oribatid mites from a dung pile near an elephant site that an immature stage exists. The study concluded at least five species were contained at least one immature life stage of the cestode.

Studies have shown that Anoplocephala manubriata is closely related to another Anoplocephala species called Anoplocephala perfoliata, which is a host-specific tapeworm to horses. Phylogenetic analysis of the second internal transcribed spacer region (ITS-2), a portion of the 28S region and cytochrome c oxidase subunit I (COX1) genes verified its relationship. Asian elephants have a high prevalence for Strongylidae and Anoplocephala spp. infection.

== Hosts ==
Oribatid mites, the intermediate hosts, are a large group of free-living, soil-dwelling acarines. They have low fecundity and life development varies from months to 2 years in temperate soils. They are of economic importance to parasites by increasing the breakdown organic material in soil. There are more than 6 species of oribatid mites (Galumna racilis, Kilimabates pilosus, Kilimabates sp., Scheloribates fusifer, Muliercula ngoyensis and Zygoribatula undulata).

Elephants, the definitive hosts, acquires infection by eating oribatid mites. Elephants who have gastrointestinal problems are more likely to acquire an A. manubriata parasitic infection by accidentally swallowing infected oribatid mites in the dirt the elephants dwell in. These elephants would excrete feces containing the cestode into the dirt, where other elephants can come in contact with the infected mite, adding to the prevalence of infected elephants.

== Typology and Morphology ==
Adult A. manubriata are white in color. They also contain strobila that stretch out towards the posterior end of the organism that range from 0.7 cm to 1.8 cm long. The anterior end of the worm contains a scolex, which has a circumference of approximately 1.5 to 2.1 cm. This scolex contains four large oral suckers and does not have hooks or rosetellum.

The proglottids of the worms contain both longitudinal and traverse muscles; this was determined by microscopic evaluation. The proglottid is divided into two distinct compartments called the cortex and medulla.

== Pathology ==
- Symptoms: Clinical signs of infection are anorexia, mud eating, and general deterioration of the body.
- Diagnosis: Infected elephants are not tested for the infection until they have died, which then an autopsy of the elephant is taken to test if it was infected for research purposes.
- Treatment: There is no treatment for A. manubriata infection in elephants.

== Phylogeny – species & hosts ==
- Anoplocephala magna – infects humans. Occurs worldwide, more frequent in USA, less in Europe.
- Anoplocephala manubriata – infects elephants.
- Anoplocephala perfoliate - infects horses. Causes horse colic.
- Anoplocephala plicata - same as A. magna
