= Bertielliasis =

Parasitic infection caused by a cestode tapeworm

- Specialty: Infectious disease

Bertielliasis is the infection of Bertiella, a cestode tapeworm parasite that primarily infects nonhuman primates, rodents and Australian marsupials. Occasionally, human infections have been documented by one of two species: Bertiella studeri, or Bertiella mucronata. Of 29 different Bertiella species, only these two can infect humans.

These infections present with symptoms similar to most tapeworm cases, and are frequently misdiagnosed. Bertiella transmission is through oribatid mites that are often present in the soil of problem areas, and can be easily prevented by avoiding contact with nonhuman primates, rodents and soil in these areas.

== Signs and symptoms ==
Bertielliasis can be asymptomatic, or present with symptoms similar to many other tapeworms. These can include epigastric pain after meals accompanied by nausea, diarrhea, anorexia, loss of weight and, generally, a tender abdomen. Fever is not typically a symptom, but there are also reported cases of constipation. The symptoms may be intermittent or continuous and seem to be more common in children. There are rare cases where the abdominal pain and vomiting have become severe. The incubation period is unknown.

== Cause ==
=== Transmission ===
While it is a parasite infecting mostly primates, rodents and other mammals, Bertiella is transmitted to humans by the accidental consumption of oribatid mites, which are the intermediate hosts. These mites are important components of soil fauna, and are widely distributed. In the rare cases that dogs and humans have contracted an infection, it is attributed to proximity and frequency of soil contact in certain regions. More than 50 cases of Bertiella have been cited, with a high frequency of those being children. The disease is reportedly endemic to 29 countries. In documented cases in Mauritius, the infection was traced back to the consumption of guavas which had been picked up from the ground.

=== Reservoir ===
Non-human primates, rodents, Australian marsupials.

=== Morphology ===
Like all Cyclophyllidea, Bertiella has a scolex, suckers, and many segments called proglottids. These are released into the body from the adult tapeworm, contain both male and female anatomical structures, and are in stages of mature, postmature and gravid. In general, human Bertiella morphology is not well understood due to the rarity of infection, and therefore limited possibility for study and observation. Particularly lacking are descriptions of adult stages of the species. Most common are studies of proglottids passed in stool samples of infected hosts. Studies have shown that specimens collected from humans are essentially morphologically the same as specimens collected from monkey hosts, except for some anatomical differences in reproductive organs. However, these discrepancies in morphological findings have led researchers to postulate that there may be more than two human Bertiella species, as previously believed. These gravid proglottids in stool are white and can measure around 11 mm for maximum length and 8 mm for maximum width. Full tapeworm observations in the past have included a worm that was 130 mm long, 15 mm in width, and 2.5 mm in thickness. It had a scolex, neck, and 418 proglottids.

Differences in human species: B. mucronata has smaller eggs than B. studeri. There are filaments arising from the pyriform apparatus clearly identifiable on B. studeri but not B. mucronata.

=== Life cycle ===
There is relatively little known about the life cycle of Bertiella, but inferences and assumptions can be made about it through observations of specific parts of the worm, and knowledge of other cases in the same family (Anoplocephalidae). Anoplocephalids are heteroxenous parasites and require both an intermediate and definitive host to complete their cycle. For Bertiella, nonhuman primates are generally the definitive host, and oribatid mites are the intermediate host.

Human infection occurs when a person inadvertently consumes an oribatid mite infected with Bertiella larvae. Within the human (the definitive host) the larvae migrate through the gastrointestinal tract, using their morphology to stick onto parts of the intestines. From there, the adult tapeworms can live for at least two years, feeding off the host and producing/shedding eggs and proglottids. The eggs and proglottids are passed in stool, and the eggs are taken up by oribatid mites (the intermediate host) in the soil. In the mites, Bertiella develops into the infective cysticercoid and begin producing larvae. The mites are then consumed by humans again, or by the nonhuman primate or rodent reservoir.

== Diagnosis ==
A Bertiella infection is typically diagnosed by observing eggs or proglottids in stool. They can be white, around 8 mm wide and 11 mm long, and moving. It can also be identified by presenting with common signs and symptoms in an area where disease is present, and there is close contact with soil and/or nonhuman primates. In many of these areas, other parasitic diseases can be a problem to the population, and finding the proglottids in stool samples can be the only way to distinguish Bertiella from other parasites. The appearance of the eggs has been described as "slightly oval and thin-shelled" while the "embryo is encased in a capsule or pyriform apparatus with two blunt horns."

== Prevention ==
Due to the low occurrence of this infection in humans, and non-lethal symptoms, it is not considered a public health crisis where large steps have to be taken toward prevention or the development of a vaccine. The most common way to prevent this infection in humans is to avoid contact with nonhuman primates and the soil in their proximity. In Mauritius and other similar regions, children (specifically) and adults are strongly discouraged from eating guavas that have fallen on the ground.

== Management ==
There is not an officially established treatment due to rarity of disease. Most are misdiagnosed anyway and treated with general medicines against cestodes. One record of treatment in a Bertiella case in Equatorial Guinea, documented a patient treated with praziquantel in a 40 mg/kg body weight, in a single dose, followed by a second, similar dose 20 days later. From then, the proglottid excretion and oesophageal pain desisted. In another instance of B. studeri infection, niclosamide was recommended as an appropriate anti-helminthic therapy.

== Epidemiology ==
The two forms of human Bertiella are distributed geographically: B. studeri is a parasite of monkeys in the Old World (Asia and Africa), and B. mucronata is found in the New World (South America and Cuba). As of 1999, 56 cases had been reported in the literature, 45 cases due to B. studeri, 7 due to B. mucronata, 4 due to unspecified Bertiella species. Additional case reports of B. studeri were published from Vietnam in 2003 and China in 2006.

== History ==
The suborder of Anoplocephala was named in 1891 by Blanchard, and the family Anoplocephalidae created in 1928 by Mola. Bertia, already named by Blanchard in 1891, was placed in this group. With some shuffling throughout the years, this family remained mostly the same, categorized by its similar transmission by oribatid mites. As of 1994, within the Cyclophyllidea order, Anoplocephalidae is considered one of the four subfamilies established by classifying uterine development, the others being Linstowiinae, Inermicapsiferinae and Thysanosomatinae. Bertia was first described in a chimpanzee as Bertia satyri, and in an orangutan as B. studeri by Blanchard (1891). The genus Berti was later changed to Bertiella on the proposal from Stiles and Hassall (1902), and the human forms were identified as Bertiella studeri and Bertiella mucronata. The first case of human bertielliasis was reported by Blanchard in 1913 of a child in Mauritius.
