= Caryophyllaeides =

Scientific classification
- Kingdom: Animalia
- Phylum: Platyhelminthes
- Class: Cestoda
- Order: Caryophyllidea
- Family: Lytocestidae
- Genus: Caryophyllaeides; Nybelin, 1918

Genus of worms

Caryophyllaeides is a genus of flatworms belonging to the family Lytocestidae.

Species:

- Caryophyllaeides ergensi Scholz, 1990
- Caryophyllaeides fennicus (Schneider, 1902)
- Caryophyllaeides skrjabini Popoff, 1922
