= Caryophyllaeus =

Scientific classification
- Kingdom: Animalia
- Phylum: Platyhelminthes
- Class: Cestoda
- Order: Caryophyllidea
- Family: Caryophyllaeidae
- Genus: Caryophyllaeus; Gmelin, 1790

Genus of worms

Caryophyllaeus is a genus of flatworms belonging to the family Caryophyllaeidae.

The species of this genus are found in Europe and Northern America.

Species:

- Caryophyllaeus auriculatus (Kulakovskaya, 1961)
- Caryophyllaeus balticus (Szidat, 1941)
