= Joyeuxiella =

Scientific classification
- Kingdom: Animalia
- Phylum: Platyhelminthes
- Class: Cestoda
- Order: Cyclophyllidea
- Family: Dilepididae
- Subfamily: Dipylidiinae
- Genus: Joyeuxiella; Fuhrmann, 1935

Genus of flatworms

Joyeuxiella is a genus of flatworms belonging to the family Dipylidiidae.

Species of the genus are found worldwide in warm regions. They parasitize cats, dogs, and wild carnivores, while coprophagous beetles, reptiles, and small mammals serve as intermediary hosts. Two hosts (Eurasian lynx) of endangered species were recently found in Iran and the flatworm genus Joyeuxiella was proved to be the reason for death. Unlike some other related species, their egg sacs contain only one egg.

There are three accepted species of the genus:

- Joyeuxiella echinorhynchoides (Sonsino, 1884)
- Joyeuxiella pasqualei (Diamara, 1893)
- Joyeuxiella rossicum (Skrjabin, 1928)
