= Bertiella studeri =

Scientific classification
- Kingdom: Animalia
- Phylum: Platyhelminthes
- Class: Cestoda
- Order: Cyclophyllidea
- Family: Anoplocephalidae
- Genus: Bertiella
- Species: B. studeri

Binomial name
- Bertiella studeri (Blanchard, 1891)

Species of flatworm

Bertiella studeri is a species of Bertiellia, a type of cestodes (tapeworms). It is a parasite of primates which was first described in the rhesus macaque (Macaca mulatta) in 1940. The intermediate host are oribatid mites, which ingest the eggs, and are themselves ingested by the vertebrate host. Oribatid mites infected with Bertiella transfer the developmental cysticercoid stage to a human host through tissue feeding.

This is one of two species of Bertiella that cause Bertielliasis in humans (the other being Bertiella mucronata). The majority of human cases occur in individuals who have some level of contact with non-humanprimates. Geographic distribution of cases demonstrate Bertiellia infection within countries from Asia, Africa, and the Americas.

== Morphology ==
An adult B. studeri tapeworm measures 10–30 cm long, and is 1 cm wide. The adult develops in the small intestine of the primate host. Once the adult develops in the small intestine, section of proglottid are expelled through the anus every 2 to 3 days. The average length of a B. Studeri proglottid segment is 0.1 cm with an average width ranging from 0.68 to 1.10 cm. B. Studeri infection in humans is usually asymptomatic. Although, infection can also lead to gastrointestinal irritation, diarrhea, abdominal pain, anorexia, weight loss, vomit and/or constipation.

Eggs from proglottids of Bertiella studeri, seen under the microscope (scale bar = 10 μm)
