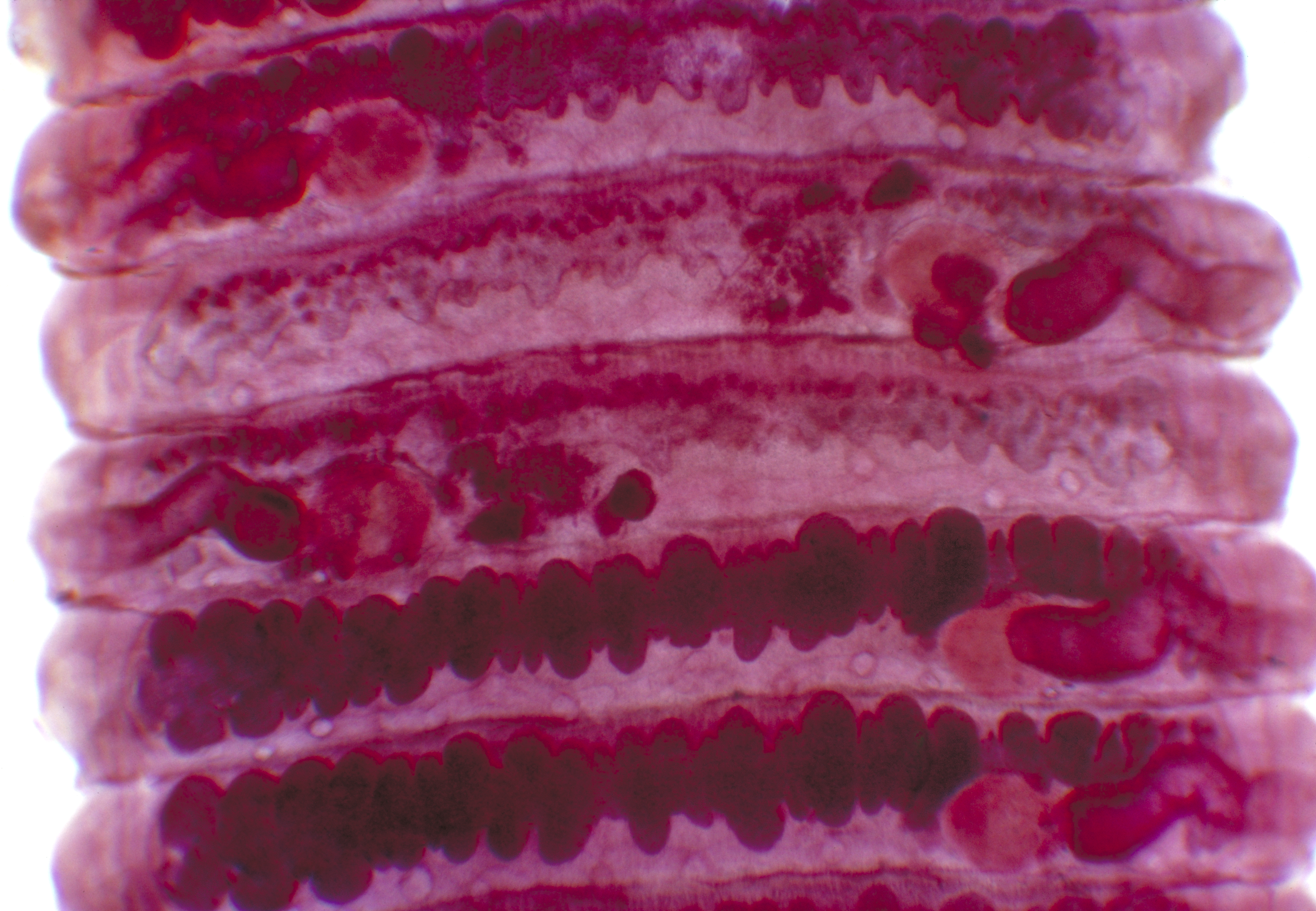
- Bertiella studeri

Scientific classification
- Kingdom: Animalia
- Phylum: Platyhelminthes
- Class: Cestoda
- Order: Cyclophyllidea
- Family: Anoplocephalidae
- Genus: Bertiella; Stiles & Hassall, 1902

= Bertiella (flatworm) =

Genus of flatworms

Bertiella is a genus of cestode tapeworm parasites that primarily infects nonhuman primates, rodents and Australian marsupials. Infections by Bertiella are known as bertielliasis. Occasional human infections have been documented by one of two species: Bertiella studeri, or Bertiella mucronata. Bertiella transmission is through oribatid mites that are present in the soil of problem areas, and can be easily prevented by avoiding contact with nonhuman primates, rodents and soil in these areas.

== Pathology ==
Of 29 different Bertiella species, only two can infect humans: Bertiella studeri (majority of human cases), and Bertiella mucronata. Infected patients are usually asymptomatic. Often individuals will have no fever and show no signs of internal organ damage or distress. Although symptoms are unique to each individual, an infected human may suffer from gastrointestinal irritation, diarrhea, abdominal pain, anorexia, weight loss, vomit and/or constipation.

== Treatment ==
Albendazole is not effective in treating this condition; praziquantel is the preferred agent.
