= Diandrya =

Scientific classification
- Kingdom: Animalia
- Phylum: Platyhelminthes
- Class: Cestoda
- Order: Cyclophyllidea
- Family: Anoplocephalidae
- Genus: Diandrya; Darrah, 1930

Type species
- Diandrya composita Darrah, 1930

Species
- Diandrya composita Diandrya vancouverensis

Genus of flatworms

Diandrya is a genus of cestode parasites that are known from marmots (Marmota spp.) in North America. The species Diandrya composita, described along with the genus by J. G. Darrah in 1930, is known from all North American marmots except the woodchuck (M. monax). The species D. vancouverensis, described by T. F. Mace and C. D. Shepard in 1981, is only known from the Vancouver Island marmot (M. vancouverensis), an island endemic on Vancouver Island. Subsequent research confirmed D. vancouverensis to be genetically unique from D. composita.
