= Bertiella mucronata =

Scientific classification
- Kingdom: Animalia
- Phylum: Platyhelminthes
- Class: Cestoda
- Order: Cyclophyllidea
- Family: Anoplocephalidae
- Genus: Bertiella
- Species: B. mucronata

Binomial name
- Bertiella mucronata (Meyner, 1895)

Species of flatworm

Bertiella mucronata is a species of Bertiella, a type of cestode tapeworms known to cause Bertielliasis. It belongs to the genus Bertiella, family Anoplocephalidae. This is one of two species of Bertiella that can cause the condition in humans (the other being Bertiella studeri).

== Epidemiology ==
The genus Bertiella has 29 cestode species that infect primarily non-human primates. B. studeri and B. mucronata can cause the condition in humans. It usually occurs in children with close contact to non-human primates. This is known to occur in Africa, Asia, Oceania, South America and Cuba.

== Life cycle/reproduction ==
The life cycle of Bertiella species has a two-host life cycle. An arthropod (such as a mite) serves as the intermediate host, and a vertebrate serves as the definitive host.

First, the eggs and proglottids are passed in the feces of the definitive host. There oncospheres are ingested by the arthropod intermediate host. Once ingested, the oncospheres develop into cysticercoids. The definitive hosts then become infected after ingesting arthropod intermediate hosts infected with cysticercoids. The cysticercoid everts an unarmed scolex, which it uses to attach to the small intestinal wall. Adults remain in the small intestine of the host, releasing eggs and repeating the cycle.

== Symptoms/treatment ==
Human cases are exceptionally rare, but most patients have reported no symptoms or some mild gastrointestinal symptoms, ranging from constipation, loss of appetite and weight, to general fatigue. Treatment consists of various anthelminthic agents, such as Quinacrine34, niclosamide, praziquantel, and albendazole34.
