= Stocksia =

Stocksia may refer to:

- Stocksia (flatworm), a genus of flatworms in the family Lytocestidae
- Stocksia (plant), a genus of plants in the family Sapindaceae
