= Olympic marmot =

Conservation status
- Least Concern (IUCN 3.1)

Scientific classification
- Kingdom: Animalia
- Phylum: Chordata
- Class: Mammalia
- Order: Rodentia
- Family: Sciuridae
- Genus: Marmota
- Subgenus: Marmota (Petromarmota)
- Species: M. olympus

Binomial name
- Marmota olympus (Merriam, 1898)
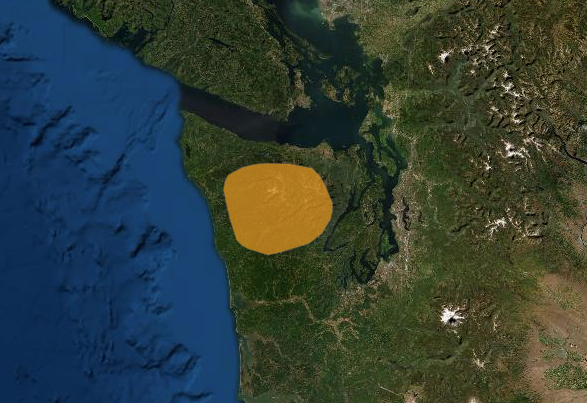
- Range

Synonyms
- Arctomys olympus Merriam, 1898

Species of rodent found in Washington, U.S.

The Olympic marmot (Marmota olympus) is a rodent in the squirrel family, Sciuridae. It occurs only in the U.S. state of Washington, at the middle elevations of the Olympic Peninsula. The closest relatives of this species are the hoary marmot and the Vancouver Island marmot. In 2009, it was declared the official endemic mammal of Washington state.

This marmot is about the size of a domestic cat, typically weighing about 8 kg (18 lb) in summer. The species shows the greatest sexual dimorphism found in marmots, with adult males weighing on average 23% more than females. It can be identified by a wide head, small eyes and ears, stubby legs, and a long, bushy tail. Its sharp, rounded claws aid in digging burrows. The coat color changes with the season and with age, but an adult marmot's coat is brown all over with small white areas for most of the year.

The species has a diet consisting mainly of a variety of meadow flora, including dry grasses, which it also uses as bedding in burrows. It is preyed on by various terrestrial mammals and avian raptors, but its main predator today is the coyote. However, the complex system of communication through whistling means most marmots remain safe for their entire life. The Olympic marmot is rated a species of the least concern on the IUCN Red List. It is protected by law in the Olympic National Park, which contains most of its habitat.

The burrows of this marmot are made in colonies, which are found in various mountain locations and differ in size. A colony may contain as few as one marmot family or multiple families with up to 40 marmots. Olympic marmots are very sociable animals which often engage in play fighting and vocalize four different whistles to communicate. During hibernation, which begins in September, they are in a deep sleep and do not eat, causing them to lose half their body mass. Adults emerge in May and their young in June. Female marmots reach sexual maturity at three years of age and produce litters of 1–6 young every other mating season.

== Taxonomy ==
American zoologist and ethnographer Clinton Hart Merriam first formally described the Olympic marmot in 1898, as Arctomys olympus, from a specimen he and Vernon Orlando Bailey collected on the Sol Duc River. The genus, Arctomys, is from the Greek for "bear-mouse". The species name, olympus (Olympic in Greek), was given because this species is native to the Olympic Peninsula. The species now is classified with all other marmots in the genus Marmota. Zoologist R. L. Rausch classified the Olympic marmot as the subspecies olympus of Marmota marmota (he included all North American marmots in this species, which now only includes the Eurasian Alpine marmot) in 1953, but it has usually been treated as a distinct species, a classification supported by taxonomic reviews starting with that of zoologist Robert S. Hoffmann and colleagues in 1979.

Within Marmota, the Olympic marmot is grouped with species such as the hoary marmot (M. caligata) in the subgenus Petromarmota. Among this grouping, mitochondrial DNA analyses suggest that the Olympic marmot could be the sister species to all other species in the group. The Olympic marmot is thought to have originated during the last glacial period as an isolated relict population of the hoary marmot in the Pleistocene ice-free refugia. As of October 2011, molecular data indicate that the most recent common ancestor of the Olympic marmot and its closest relatives lived 2.6 million years ago.

The Olympic marmot deviates from the typical Petromarmota marmots in the shape and large size of its mandible (jawbone), in differences of the dorsal (back) region, and having 40 chromosomes instead of 42, all of which are characteristics that resemble the subgenus Marmota. Some of the differences of the Olympic marmot's jawbone from the typical Petromarmota are also evident in the Vancouver Island marmot (M. vancouverensis), which evolved separately, but also occurs in a restricted range with a small population.

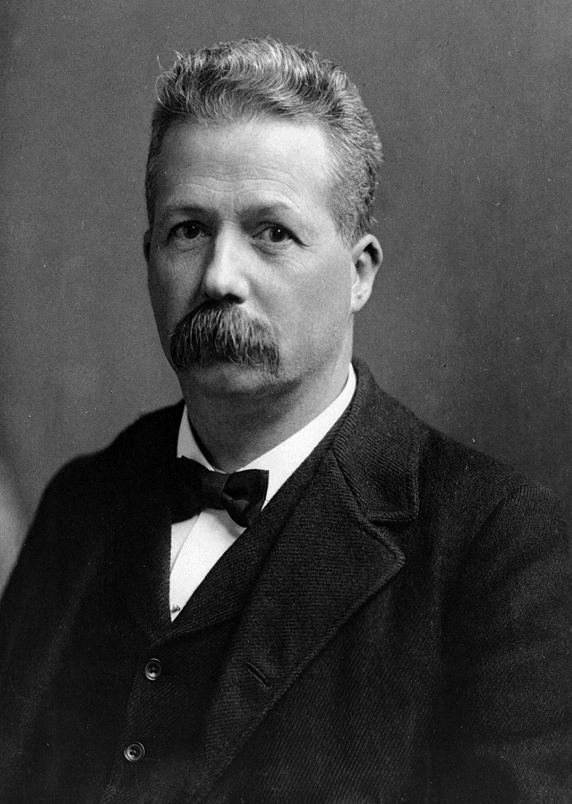
Clinton Hart Merriam, the first to describe the Olympic marmot

== Description ==
The lighter fur patches characteristic of the Olympic marmot in summertime

The Olympic marmot's head is wide with small eyes and ears; the body is stocky with stubby legs and sharp, rounded claws that facilitate digging; the tail is bushy and ranges from 18 to 24 cm (7.1 to 9.4 in) long. The Olympic marmot is about the size of a domestic cat; adults typically weigh from 2.7 to 11 kg (6.0 to 24.3 lb) and are from 67 to 75 cm (26 to 30 in) in length, with the average being 71 cm (28 in). This species may have the most pronounced sexual dimorphism found in marmots, with adult males weighing on average 4.1 to 9.3 kg (9.0 to 20.5 lb), post emergence in spring and at peak weights in autumn, respectively, and adult females weighing 3.1 to 7.1 kg (6.8 to 15.7 lb) at the same times. The Olympic marmot is the largest of the six marmot species found in North America, averaging slight heavier in mean body mass than hoary marmot and Vancouver marmot. Mean linear dimensions suggest the Olympic species is about 7% larger on average than these other two large North American species. The species rivals some lesser-studied Asian species as the largest marmots and largest members of the squirrel family, with similar body masses attained by some species such as the Tarbagan marmot and the Himalayan marmot.

The coat is double-layered, consisting of soft, thick underfur, for warmth, and coarser outer hairs. Infant marmots' fur is dark gray in color; this changes in the yearling period to grayish brown with lighter patches. The adult coat is brown on the body with some smaller white or pale brown patches for most of the year, becoming darker overall as the year progresses. The first molt of the year occurs in June, commencing with two black patches of fur forming on the back of the shoulders. This black coloration then spreads to the rest of the body, and by the fall the coat is almost black. A second molt is thought to occur during hibernation, and upon emergence from hibernation in the spring Olympic marmots may be tan or yellowish. The Olympic marmot's muzzle is almost always white, with a white band in front of the eyes.

This species can be readily distinguished from the hoary marmot, with which it shares almost every other physical trait, by the lack of contrasting black feet and a black spot on the head. The Vancouver Island marmot has a similar coat color—chocolate brown with white patches.

== Distribution and habitat ==
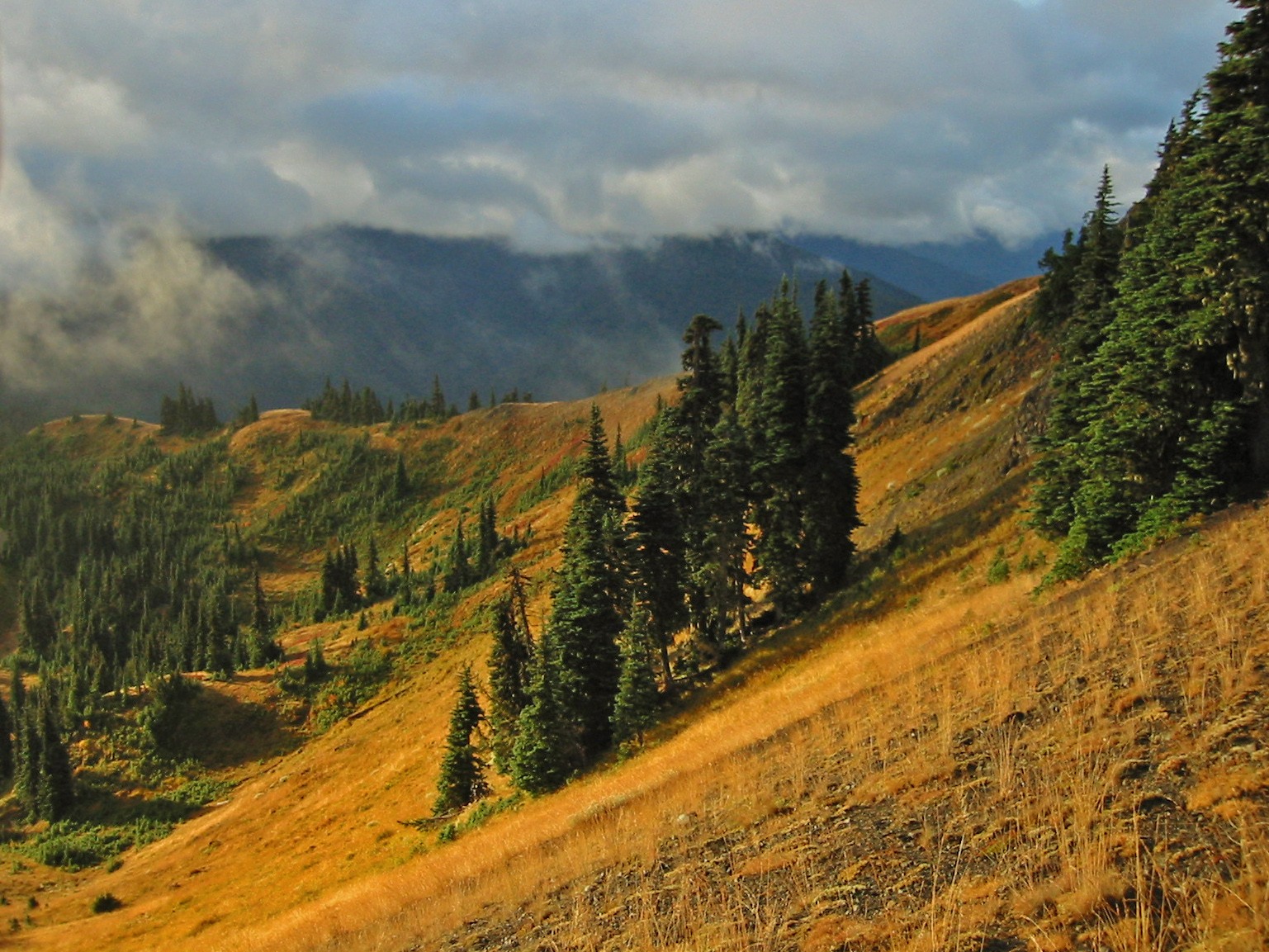
Typical Olympic marmot habitat: a slope on Hurricane Ridge

Olympic marmots are native to the Olympic Mountains in the Olympic Peninsula of Washington state. About 90% of Olympic marmots' total habitat is located in Olympic National Park, where they are often sighted, especially on Hurricane Hill. Marmots are in decline in some areas of the park due to encroachment by trees into meadows as well as predation by coyotes, and they are seldom seen in the wetter southwestern part.

Within the park, Olympic marmots inhabit lush sub-alpine and alpine meadows, fields, and montane scree slopes. They live in colonies spread out in various locations in the mountains and containing the burrows of varied numbers of marmot families. Some meadows can contain as few as one marmot family, while some can have multiple families, amounting to as many as 40 marmots. There is a higher risk of inbreeding and death from random events in meadows with fewer marmots, making migration essential to the survival of the species. Burrows can be found at elevations ranging from 920 m (3,020 ft) to 1,990 m (6,530 ft); they are most often found in the range of 1,500 m (4,900 ft) to 1,750 m (5,740 ft). Burrows are more frequently located on south-facing slopes, which generally receive more precipitation, 75 cm (30 in) per year (mostly snow), and thus have more available flora. The home range of a family of marmots usually covers from half an acre to five acres (0.2–2 hectares). The Olympic marmot is well-adapted to its generally cold natural habitat, where there is snowfall almost every month of the year on the mountain slopes and barren grasslands.

== Ecology ==
=== Feeding ===
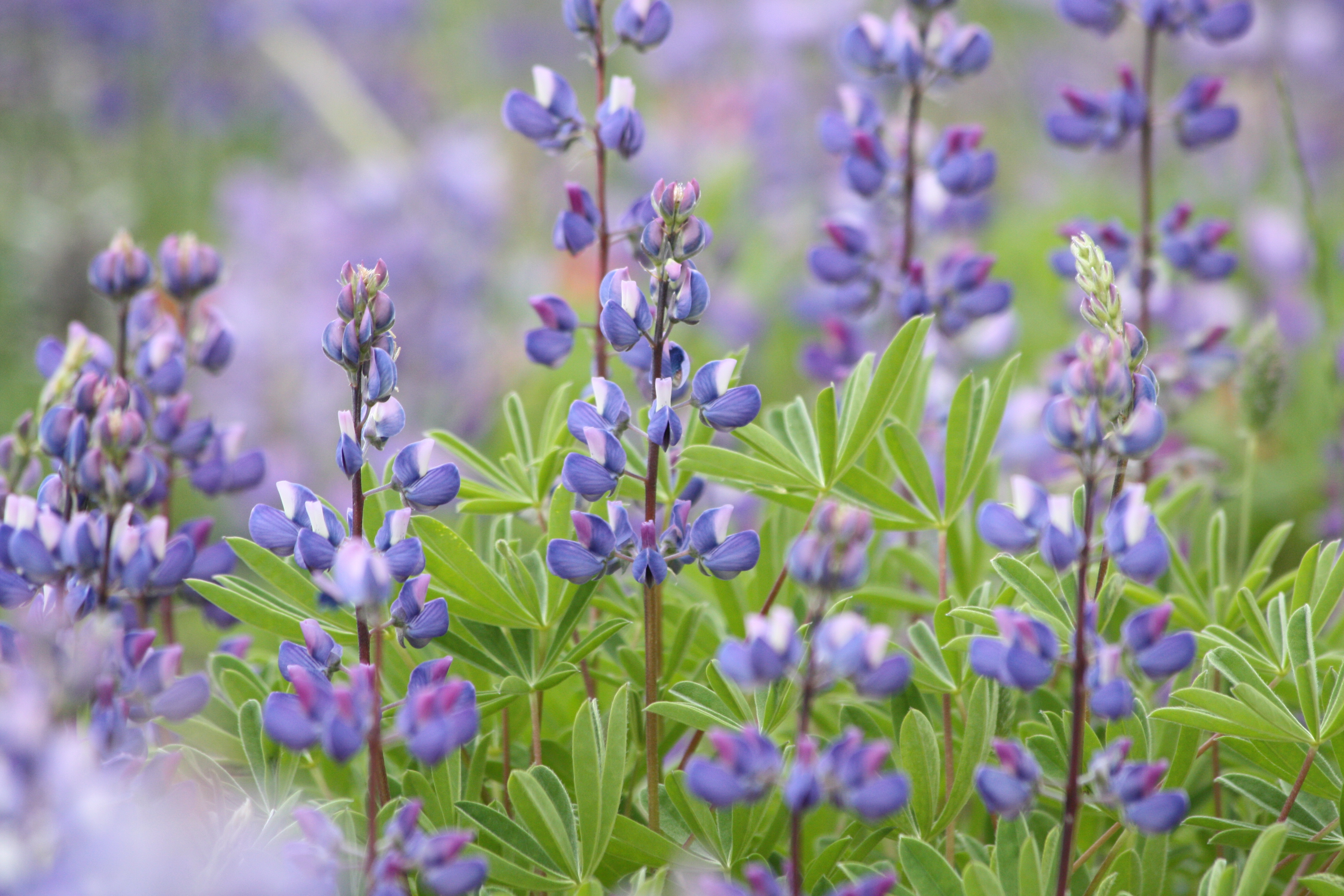
Lupine, a major part of the Olympic marmot's diet, near Hurricane Ridge

Olympic marmots eat meadow flora such as avalanche and glacier lilies, heather blossoms, subalpine lupine, mountain buckwheat, harebells, sedges, and mosses. They prefer green, tender, flowering plants over other sources of food, but roots are a large part of their diets in the early spring when other plants have not yet appeared. During May and June, they may resort to gnawing on trees for food. They also occasionally eat fruits and insects. Their water requirements are met by the juice in the vegetation they eat and dew on the plants' surfaces.

When snowfall covers vegetation, marmots have a more omnivorous diet, consuming carrion encountered while digging for roots and possibly killing late hibernating chipmunks (Neotamias townsendii). At this time, they also obtain water from melted snow. Hibernating Olympic marmots do not keep food in their burrows; instead, they put on fat before hibernating and can double their body weight to survive eight months without eating.

=== Predation ===
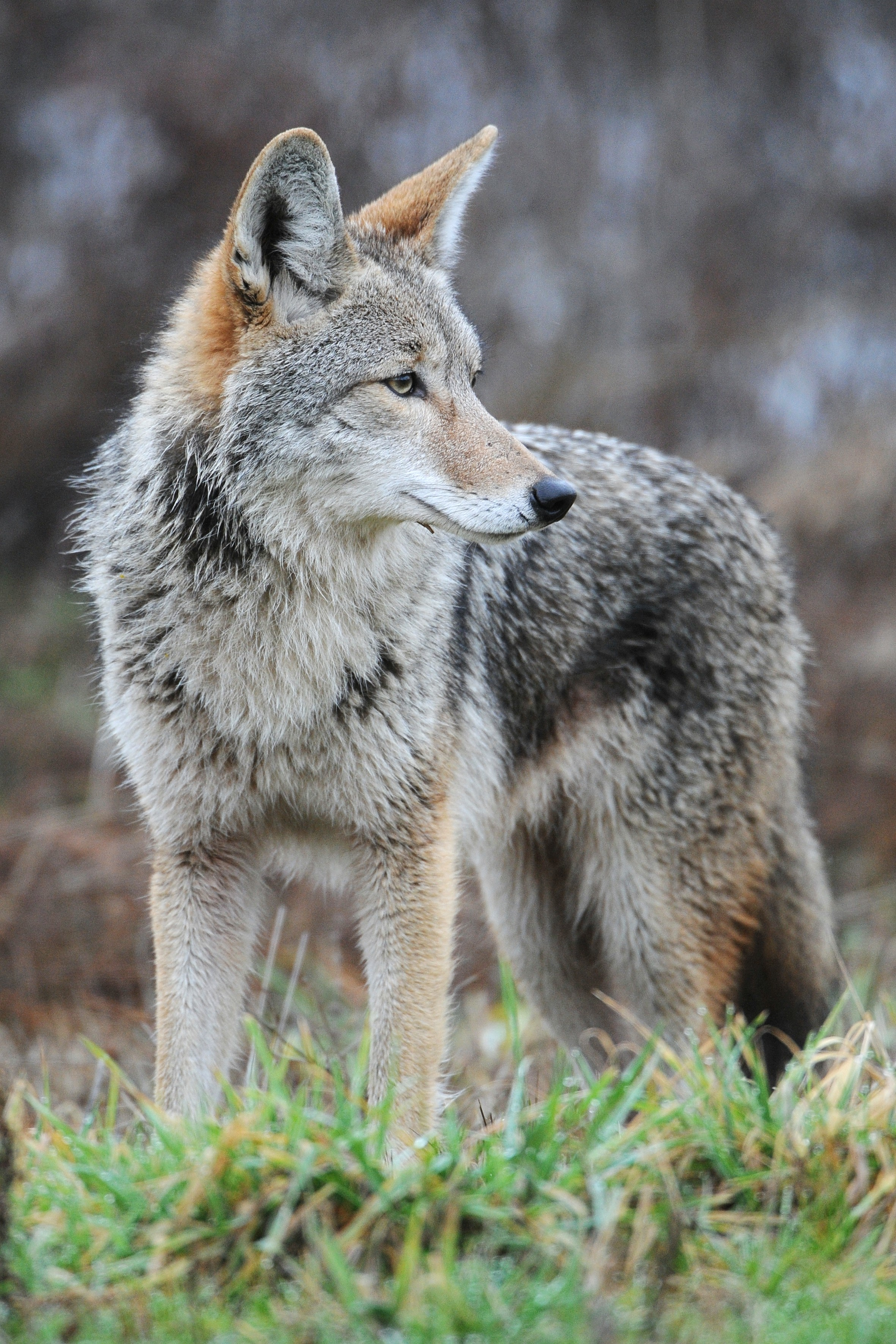
The coyote is the Olympic marmot's main predator.

The Olympic marmot's predators are mostly terrestrial mammals such as coyotes, cougars, and bobcats; however, it is also preyed on by avian raptors such as golden eagles. Evidently, black bears rarely prey on marmots—bears' presence close to colonies generally does not elicit alarm calls, unless the bear advances to within 6 m (20 ft) of the colony. The coyote is the Olympic marmot's primary predator, and studies show that marmots make up approximately 20% of coyotes' diet during the summer months.

In common with all other marmots, Olympic marmots use an alarm call known as a trill to alert other marmots to predators. Continuing alarm calls indicate that a predator is close, and cause marmots to display increased vigilance; a single alarm call results in the marmots curiously looking around for the predator. Sightings of land predators, especially coyotes, receive more alarm calls than aerial predators. Fishers are viewed as predators by Olympic marmots, eliciting alarm calls even when just passing by a colony. Trill calls have also been observed being used to trick and frustrate predators. When a marmot becomes nervous or bothered by a predator, it may retract its top lip to show its upper incisors.

David P. Barash reported that when hunting Olympic marmots, a coyote or cougar approach a marmot to within about 15 m (49 ft), advance to a fir tree close to its prey, and then chase the marmot from uphill.

As humans in the Olympic National Park do not hunt the marmot, but simply observe them, they do not pose a threat to them. When researchers intrude on colonies to observe behavior, the families living in burrows there initially make ascending calls, showing surprise, but later adjust to the presence of humans, allowing studies to proceed.

Parasites of the Olympic marmot include Diandrya composita and fleas of the genus Oropsylla.

== Behavior ==
=== Colonies ===
Olympic marmots are gregarious burrowing animals, living in colonies typically containing multiple burrows. Activity varies with the weather, time of day, and time of year. Due to rainfall and fog cover during June, July, and August, marmots spend most of the day inside their burrows during these months, and emerging to forage for food mostly in the morning and evening. At other times of year, Olympic marmots can sometimes be found lying on rocks where they sun themselves for warmth, grooming each other, playing, chirping, and feeding together. Burrows are used for hibernation, protection from bad weather and predators, and to raise newborn pups.

A typical colony consists of a male, two to three females, and their young, totalling a dozen or more animals. Young marmots stay with their family for at least two years, so a burrow is often home to a newly born litter and a litter of two-year-olds. Marmots seldom move to other colonies with the exception of sub-adults of two to three years old, which may leave the home colony to start a new family elsewhere; females move only a few hundred meters, while males often move several kilometers away from their birth burrow.

A colony may have a subordinate or "satellite" male, smaller and younger than the dominant male, who may take over as the dominant male if the incumbent dies. The satellite male lives in a separate burrow, 55 to 150 m (200 to 500 ft) away from the rest of the colony. After emerging from hibernation, if the satellite male and the dominant male are both still living in the same colony, the dominant male may chase the satellite around multiple times per day. The satellite male's feeding area is limited to areas far from the other marmots in the colony, and the dominant male prevents the satellite male from approaching other marmots' burrows as long as he is near. While the satellite male does not approach the other marmots in the colony, other marmots sometimes visit the satellite male's burrow. Male-male competition ends around the same time as the reproductive season.

=== Communication ===
When greeting each other, these very sociable animals will usually touch noses or nose to cheek; in courtship rituals they may inter-lock teeth and nibble each other's ears and necks. They may also engage in play fighting, in which two marmots on their hind legs push each other with their paws; this play fighting is more aggressive between older marmots. In fights that have been observed during a study, only about 10% of fights had distinct outcomes.

When communicating vocally, Olympic marmots have four different types of whistles, differing in this from their close relatives, the hoary marmot and the Vancouver Island marmot. These whistles include flat calls, ascending calls, descending calls, and trills; the pitch of all of these is in a small frequency range near 2,700 Hz. Flat, ascending, and descending calls are most often voiced singly. The ascending call has a duration of about half a second, starting with a "yell" on one note and ending with a "chip" on a higher note; it is often used as a distress or warning call for unfamiliar smells and noises. These same "yips" are heard when Olympic marmots are play fighting, along with low growls and chattering of teeth. The descending call ends at a lower pitch than that at which it started. The trill, which sounds like multiple ascending calls chained together into one longer sound, consists of multiple ranging notes and is voiced as an alarm call to communicate to other marmots in the area that danger may be approaching and they should return to their burrows. Females with young make trill calls more often than other Olympic marmots. If marmots are not accustomed to human contact in a certain area, they may also sound a trill when seeing a person, in order to alert other marmots. At places like Hurricane Ridge, where seeing humans is a frequent occurrence, most marmots will not acknowledge human presence at all.

Olympic marmots also communicate through the sense of smell. A gland located in their cheek exudes chemicals which they rub on scenting points, such as shrubs and rocks, which can be smelled by other marmots in the area.

=== Hibernation ===
Olympic marmots begin to enter hibernation in early September. Before hibernating, the marmots bring dry grasses into the burrow for bedding or food. Sometimes in early September marmots will stay in their burrows for a few consecutive days, with only brief outings that allow for a little foraging. During this period, they do not play fight or socialize with other marmots; they limit themselves to peeking out and sitting outside their burrows. Nonparous females (those who have not given birth yet) and adult males become inactive first, because they do not need to store as much fat beforehand. The parous females, yearlings, and young of the year become inactive a few weeks later, because they have to gain more weight. The marmots of a colony hibernate in a single burrow space, which they keep closed with dirt. Adults emerge in May, and the young in June. Marmots do not eat during hibernation, so they have to store fat before becoming inactive.

These marmots are "deep hibernators"; they cannot easily be awoken. Their body temperature drops to below 40 °F (4 °C) and heart rate can slow to three beats per minute. Marmots warm their bodies about every ten days. Olympic marmots lose 50% of their body mass over the seven to eight months of winter hibernation. The period of hibernation is the most dangerous time for them—especially in years of light snowfall, as many as 50% of the young born that year die from the cold due to the lack of insulation that deeper snow provides. When they emerge in early May, thick snow cover is still present from the preceding winter, so they are not very active at this time. Sometimes marmots are disoriented after waking from hibernation; before they relearn the colony's landmarks, which may be covered in snow, Olympic marmots have been observed wandering around aimlessly until they find their burrows.

=== Life cycle ===
This species, along with the hoary marmot, has the lowest reproductive rate of any rodent. A female Olympic marmot has a litter of from one to six young (3.3 on average) in alternate years. In a given year, a third of females will have a litter. Half of the pups die before the following spring. Those pups that survive the following spring can live into their teens. Both males and females mature sexually at three years, but females generally do not reproduce until they are four and a half years old. The marmot comes out from hibernation at the beginning of May, and estrus (heat) occurs about two weeks later. After hibernation ends, both male and female Olympic marmots engage in courtship rituals. Females who have never produced a litter before tend to be more aggressive and chase or instigate fights with males; females which have already produced young tend to greet the male with nose-to-nose or nose-to-genital contact, with copulation following shortly afterwards. This approach is often more successful than the aggressive manner of the non-parous female.

Mating takes place 11 and 20 days after hibernation ends. The relationship between a sexually mature male and female Olympic marmot is polygynous; males tend to breed with three or four females in each mating season.

Approximately four weeks after mating, the female gives birth to her young in a grass-lined burrow. Newborn pups cannot see, have no fur, and are pink in color. At first, the young exhibit no sexual dimorphism. It takes about a month for young Olympic marmots to first leave the burrow; around this time, their mothers begin to wean them. Upon emerging, the young initially stay within the immediate vicinity of the burrow, where they can be often be found chasing each other and wrestling playfully. Within a few weeks, the young are fully weaned and can feed themselves. Olympic marmots are not completely independent from their mothers until they reach two years of age.

Breeding-age female marmots are extremely important to marmot populations. If a female of breeding age dies it can take years to replace her; marmot litters generally have no more than six pups, the maturation period is long, and many marmots die before reaching maturity.

== Interaction with humans ==
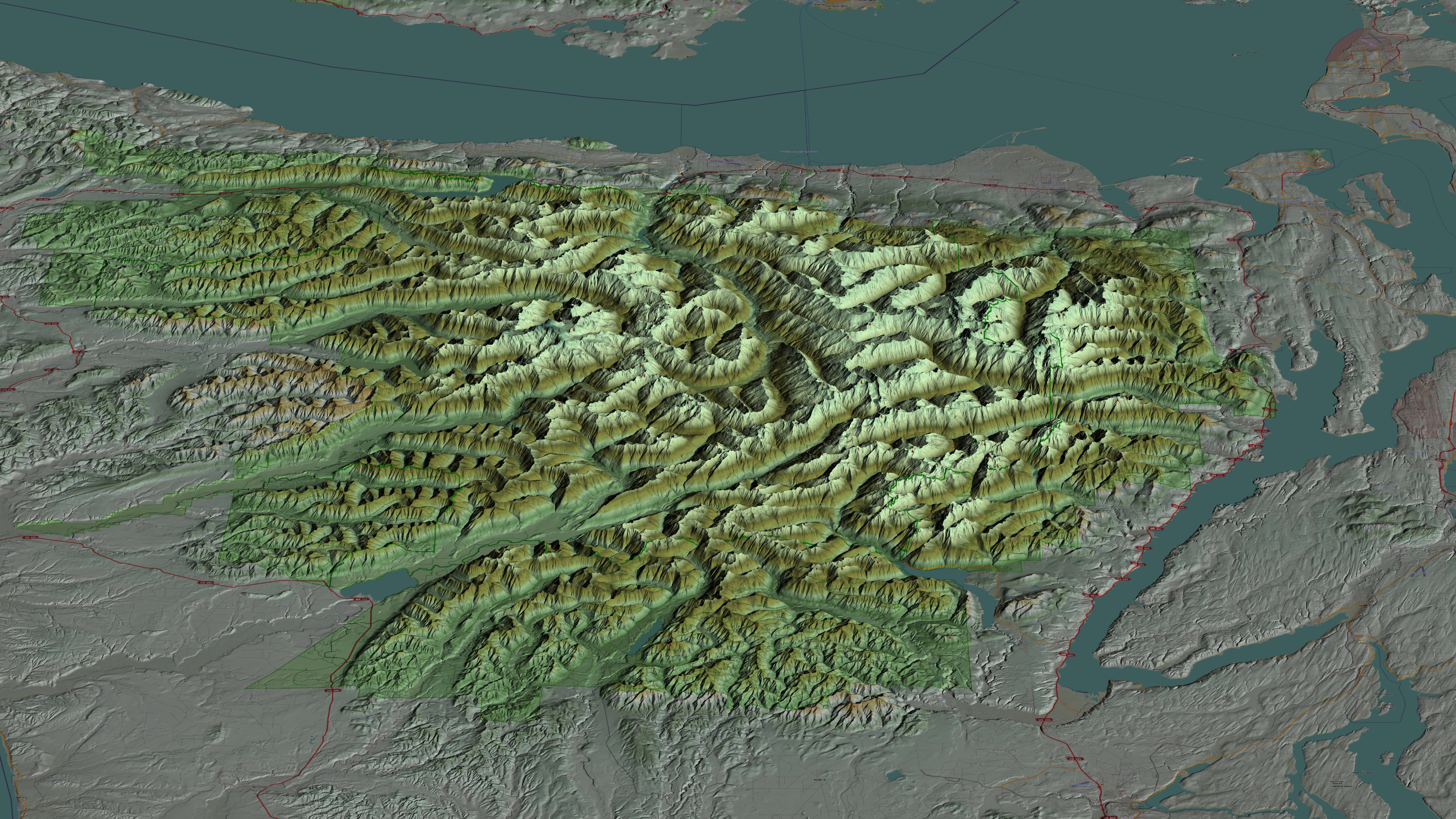
Relief map of Olympic National Park, where the Olympic marmot is protected

The Olympic marmot is the second-rarest North American marmot, behind the critically endangered Vancouver Island marmot. The first records of marmots in the Olympic Peninsula date back to the 1880s. In the 1960s, David P. Barash conducted a three-year study of Olympic marmots where he reported that there was an abundance of marmots in the mountains. In 1989, the total Olympic marmot population was calculated to be only about 2,000, but this low number was due to poor data collection. Other than this population census, little research was done on the Olympic marmot until the late 1990s, when concerns arose about population status.

Rangers and frequent visitors to the Olympic National Park had noticed that some populations of Olympic marmots had disappeared from parts of their former range. In response to this, the University of Michigan began a population study in 2002, during which the marmot population continued to decline by about 10% a year until 2006. Predation by coyotes that had not been present in the area before the 20th century was found to be the main cause of death of females, inhibiting population re-growth. By 2006, numbers had dropped to 1,000 individuals; this figure increased to around 4,000 from 2007 to 2010, when colonies stabilized and survival rates rose. In 2010, volunteers started to collect and store data about marmot populations in the park through a monitoring program. The Olympic marmot has been considered a species of least concern on the IUCN Red List since first being included in 1996. Its range is small, but 90% of its total habitat is protected due to being in Olympic National Park. The park, which holds multiple other endemic species, has been designated a UNESCO Biosphere Reserve and a World Heritage Site. State law declares that the Olympic marmot is a protected wildlife species and cannot be hunted.

The species is susceptible to climate change because of their sensitivity to habitat change. When meadows in Olympic National Park dried out, marmots there died or moved. In the long term, meadows may be superseded by forests. Climate change is expected to alter the timing, composition, and quality of the marmots' food. Olympic marmots are also more vulnerable to predators when daytime temperatures rise too high for foraging, causing them to forage in the cooler evenings when predators are more difficult to notice. In warm winters, there is heavier predation by coyotes. Marmots become more accessible to coyotes as lower banks of snow allow coyotes to move up higher on mountains where marmots dwell, into areas they could not usually reach during an average cold winter. Climate change could also have positive effects on populations; a warmer climate would result in a longer growing season may allow marmots to mature more quickly and thus breed more often.

In 2009, the Olympic marmot was designated a state symbol of Washington: the official "endemic mammal." Governor Chris Gregoire's signing of Senate Bill 5071 was the result of a two-year effort by the fourth and fifth graders of Wedgwood Elementary School in Seattle. The students researched the marmot's habits, and answered legislators' questions to overcome initial bipartisan opposition to another state symbol.

On May 13, 2024, the Center for Biological Diversity submitted an Endangered Species Act petition to the U.S. Fish and Wildlife Service asking the agency to protect the Olympic marmot under the Endangered Species Act.
