= Joyeuxiella pasqualei =

Scientific classification
- Kingdom: Animalia
- Phylum: Platyhelminthes
- Class: Cestoda
- Order: Cyclophyllidea
- Family: Dilepididae
- Genus: Joyeuxiella
- Species: J. pasqualei

Binomial name
- Joyeuxiella pasqualei (Diamara, 1893)

Species of flatworm

Joyeuxiella pasquale is a species of flatworm, belonging to the family Dipylidiidae. The species uses coprophagous beetles and reptiles as transportation hosts with dogs, cats, and other wild carnivores being their final carrier for reproduction.

== Description ==
Joyeuxiella pasqualei has a scolex with four suckers and a retractable cylindric rostellum with thornlike hooks. Structurally, the adult parasite form is similar to Dipylidium caninum, which can lead to confusion in identification, but only in its small to medium size. Distinction can be made in the gravid proglottid egg packets, which contain only a single hexacanth embryo covered by uterine material in the genus Joyeuxiella compared to Dipylidium. Within the hexacanth embryo, three pairs of hooklets are often visible. Additionally, specimens of Joyeuxiella can be distinguished from Diplopylidium because the former has rose-thorn shaped hooks, whereas the latter has claw-hammer shaped hooks similar to taeniid tapeworms. Paired genital atria are found in the anterior half of each tapeworm segment.

Joyeuxiella pasqualei has a conical rostellum with egg capsules located mediolaterally to longitudinal excretory (osmoregulatory) vessels. Testes are anterior to the vasa deferentia. Joyeuxiella fuhrmanni, on the other hand, is similar in shape to J. pasqualei, but it has no testes anterior to the vas deferens and the egg capsules are located medially to the longitudinal excretory vessels. Joyeuxiella echinorhynchoides have a long, cylindrical rostellum as well as egg capsules located medial to the longitudinal excretory canals.

== Life cycle ==
Although J. pasqualei is frequently detected in cats in southern Europe, information on its biology is scarce. These flatworms utilize coprophagous beetles and reptiles as transportation hosts with dogs, cats, and other wild carnivores being the final carrier. The reptile Tarentola mauritanica were found to have natural infections of J. pasqualei attached to the intestine with cysts in the liver. Experiments have shown that rodents cannot be infected by direct ingestion of gravid proglottids, suggesting that an invertebrate first intermediate host, such as coprophagous beetles, is necessary to complete the life cycle. However, the first intermediate host of J. pasqualei has not been definitively determined.
