= Glaridacris catostomi =

Scientific classification
- Kingdom: Animalia
- Phylum: Platyhelminthes
- Class: Cestoda
- Order: Caryophyllidea
- Family: Caryophyllaeidae
- Genus: Glaridacris
- Species: G. catostomi

Binomial name
- Glaridacris catostomi Cooper, 1920

Species of flatworm

Glaridacris catostomi (Cooper, 1920) is a flatworm of the family Caryophyllaeidae. It is commonly found in freshwater environments of North America and is a known internal parasite of fishes of the family Catostomidae.

== Physical description ==
Glaridacris catostomi is a tapeworm, implying it has a simple scolex and an unsegmented body. The defining characteristics of the genus Glaridacris are distinct male and female gonopores, an elongate body, a follicular ovary, a wedge-shaped scolex, and median and lateral vitellaria. This species has a body length of 5 to 60mm and a breadth of 0.4 to 1.0mm. Individual length varies based on location; organisms in Wisconsin can be up to 60mm, being are the longest recorded, whereas individuals in New York reach 41mm and those in Michigan are only known to reach 25mm.

The scolex of immature individuals forms a terminal disc by the protruding edges of the base and apex. There are three sucking loculi with the most developed and successful being the central loculi. Additionally, ridges are present, dividing the dorsal and ventral sides of the scolex. In adults, the terminal disc is typically observed as contracted, forming the shape of a wedge with thick margins. Following the scolex is a narrowed strobila where the reproductive organs, nervous system and excretory system are found. The body is surrounded by a thin cuticle and sub-cuticle. The genital openings follow the strobila; this is the widest section of this species. The posterior end of Glaridacris catostomi is where the excretory organs are found. This area forms a triangular shape with an indented tip. A defining physical aspect of this species is its H-shaped ovary.

== Geographic range ==
This flatworm species predominantly occurs throughout southern Canada and northern parts of the United States. In Canada, it has been found in the provinces and territories of British Columbia, Alberta, Saskatchewan, Manitoba, Ontario, Quebec, Northwest Territories, and Yukon Territories. Within the United States, occurrences have been documented in the states of Alaska, California, Colorado, Connecticut, Georgia, Illinois, Iowa, Kentucky, Massachusetts, Maine, Michigan, Minnesota, Montana, New Hampshire, New York, North Carolina, North Dakota, Ohio, Pennsylvania, South Dakota, Virginia, Wisconsin, and Wyoming. Although this flatworm has been reported in the rivers of northeastern Siberia, Russia, there is no reference specimen form existing from this location to confirm the species identification. This observation was in the longnose sucker, C. catostomos, and is thought to have been transported here by a human introduction of this host species.

== Habitat ==
Glaridacris catostomi is known to inhabit freshwater environments by parasitizing catostomid fishes. It is also found in its intermediate host, annelids. Both larvae and adult forms are found within the stomach and intestines of its hosts. Specifically, it mainly infects within the host's anterior intestine.

== Development and lifespan ==
There are three main life stages of Glaridacris catostomi; egg, larvae and adult. The eggs of cestodes become self-fertilized within the reproductive organs and are released into the host fish's intestines. The eggs get excreted by the host and become ingested by the intermediate host, an annelid. Here, the eggs hatch and develop into oncosphere larvae which travel through the intestines and eventually further develop to be procercoid larvae. Larvae of Glaridacris catostomi are found in host stomachs or intestines where they can be buried in mucosa (mucous membrane) pits. The larvae of this species are extremely small and can have no appendages. The inner and outer longitudinal muscles, testes, and cirrus sac begin developing in immature individuals. This species is able to mature into an adult once the annelid is eaten by a fish where it can move into the definitive host's body cavity.

Those found in younger fish hosts are typically immature and unreproductive, whereas specimens found in larger hosts are more likely to be worms and mature. The largest fish usually host larger worms with a greater abundance of them.

Although there is no recorded data regarding the lifespan of this species, some cestodes may live up to thirty years in other non-fish hosts.

== Reproduction ==
Like other plathyhelminthes, Glaridacris catostomi is a hermaphroditic species, meaning each individual produces both eggs and sperms. The eggs of this species are larger than comparable species, measurements falling between 54 to 55u by 38 to 48u.

== Behaviour ==
There is limited data regarding the behaviour of Glaidacris catostomi.

== Communication ==
There is currently limited data regarding the communication of this species.

== Food habits ==
Glaidacris catostomi is a parasite of catostomid fishes. Like other cestodes, it obtains nutrients by feeding through the digestive tract of the host. Here, nutrients are absorbed through the outer surface of the tapeworm. This species is known to parasitize individuals of the main host, white sucker (Catostomus commersonii). There are additional hosts including the longnose sucker (Catostomus catostomus), largescale sucker (Catostomus macrocheilus), Sacramento sucker (Catostomus occidentalis), and the creek chubsucker (Erimyzon oblonggus). There are other unverified records of hosts including the northern hogsucker (Hypentellium nigricans), greater redhorse (Moxostoma rubreques), chain pickerel (Esox niger), quillback (Carpiodes cyprinus), and logperches (Percina).

== Predation ==
There is limited data regarding the predation of Glaridacris catostomi. Although, this species is an internal parasite in the digestive system of fishes, suggesting risk of predation is minimal.

== Ecosystem roles ==
There is minimal data regarding the specific ecosystem roles of Glaidacris catostomi. Although, parasites in general are known to help maintain stable ecosystems by managing species abundances and increasing connection across the food web. Parasites can affect the behaviour of fishes, making them more susceptible to predation, mainly by birds. They can also act as indicators of ecological health because parasite populations tend to decrease as fish populations decrease. This could be useful for monitoring the effects of overfishing and pollution on host fish communities.

== Economic importance ==
Although there is limited data describing the economic importance of this species, tapeworm parasites are known to decrease fish yields, in extreme situations reducing species richness and diversity.

== Conservation status ==
There is no current conservation status for Glaridacris catostomi. Although this rarely occurs, it is suggested that a parasite is considered endangered when its host species are. The main host species, Catostomus commersonii, is listed as least concern, suggesting Glaridacris catostomi populations may be stable.

== Genomic data and Taxonomic status ==
There has been an assigned Barcode Index Number (BIN) on the Biodiversity of Life Database (BOLD). More taxonomic information can be found in the 'Taxon identifiers' box below.

According to Catalogue of Life, Glaridacris catostomi is listed as an accepted species.
