= Diandrya composita =

Scientific classification
- Kingdom: Animalia
- Phylum: Platyhelminthes
- Class: Cestoda
- Order: Cyclophyllidea
- Family: Anoplocephalidae
- Genus: Diandrya
- Species: D. composita

Binomial name
- Diandrya composita Darrah, 1930

Species of flatworm

Diandrya composita is a species of cestode parasites that is known from marmots (Marmota spp.) in North America. Described along with the genus Diandrya by J. G. Darrah in 1930, is known from all North American marmots except the woodchuck (M. monax). This particular parasite have known to possess a combination of various organs – the interproglottidal and the pedunculated glands which were thought to be a part of the Anoplocephalidae family.
