= Moniezia expansa =

Scientific classification
- Kingdom: Animalia
- Phylum: Platyhelminthes
- Class: Cestoda
- Order: Cyclophyllidea
- Family: Anoplocephalidae
- Genus: Moniezia
- Species: M. expansa

Binomial name
- Moniezia expansa Rudolphi, 1810

Species of flatworm

Moniezia expansa is commonly known as sheep tapeworm or double-pored ruminant tapeworm. It is a large tapeworm inhabiting the small intestines of ruminants such as sheep, goats and cattle. It has been reported from Peru that pigs are also infected. There is an unusual report of human infection in an Egyptian. It is characterized by unarmed scolex (i.e., hooks and rostellum are absent), presence of two sets of reproductive systems in each proglottid, and each proglottid being very short but very broad.

== Structure ==
M. expansa has a typical cestode body, consisting of the anterior scolex, followed by the neck and a highly extended body proper, the strobilus. It is an extremely long tapeworm, and can reach an enormous length up to 6–10 m. The scolex bears four large suckers, which are the holdfast organs to the host. There are no rostellum and rostellar hooks, and the suckers are devoid of spines. The boundary between the proglottids are studded with a row of interproglottid glands, which are yet undefined in terms of function. The tapeworm, being monecious, contains both male and female reproductive organs in an individual. Thus each proglottid is a complete reproductive unit. Moreover, one defining feature of the genus is that there are two sets of reproductive organs situated at lateral sides with the associated cirrus pouches and genital pores in each proglottid. The testes are numerous.

== Life cycle ==
The complete life cycle requires two hosts, ruminants as definitive hosts, and oribatid mites as intermediate hosts. Eggs are passed out from the intestine of the ruminant host along the gravid proglottids in the feces into the soil. The eggs are eaten by soil mites. Eggs must reach the gut of mite hosts within 1 day of release otherwise they are desiccated. However, chances of development is very good as soil mites can be so numerous on a pasture that even if only 3% are infected (with 4-13 cysticercoids each), a grazing ruminant may ingest over 2,000 cysticercoids per kilogram of grass. Once inside the intestine of mites, the eggs hatch and the oncospheres penetrate into the haemocoel and develops to the cysticercoid stage. This stage may take up to 4 months. When the infected mite is eaten by the grazing ruminants, mature cysticercoids are digested out of the mite, and develop into mature tapeworms in the small intestine within 5–6 weeks.

== Pathogenicity ==
M. expansa infections are generally harmless and asymptomatic, even when the tapeworms are present in large numbers in young lambs. However heavy infection may cause intestinal obstruction, diarrhea and weight loss.

== Diagnosis and treatment ==
Diagnosis is done by analysis stool sample in which eggs can be detected, or often observation of the gravid proglottids in feces and anus. Niclosamide is most often used. Praziquantel (while not approved for use in ruminants in the US) is also 99–100% effective while albendazole is 19-75% effective; and praziquantel + levamisole combination is very effective in reducing worm burden and improvement of weight.
