= Moniezia =

Scientific classification
- Kingdom: Animalia
- Phylum: Platyhelminthes
- Class: Cestoda
- Order: Cyclophyllidea
- Family: Anoplocephalidae
- Genus: Moniezia; Blanchard, 1891

Genus of flatworms

Moniezia a genus of tapeworms that are parasitic in mammals, including sheep, goat and cattle. It comprises four known species such as M. expansa, M. benedeni, M. autumnalis and M. baeri. M. expansa is the most well known species within the genus because of its high prevalence. Members of the genus are among the largest cestodes reaching up to 10 m in length. They inhabit the small intestine of mammalian host. Their life cycle is indirect requiring intermediate host, which are oribatid mites. They are characterized by the presence of interproglottid glands.
