= Cittotaenia =

Scientific classification
- Kingdom: Animalia
- Phylum: Platyhelminthes
- Class: Cestoda
- Order: Cyclophyllidea
- Family: Anoplocephalidae
- Genus: Cittotaenia; Riehm, 1881

Synonyms
- Cistotaenia Fuhrmann, 1901; Cittotoenia Sluiter & Swellengrebel, 1912

Genus of tapeworms

Cittotaenia is a genus of tapeworms belonging to the family Anoplocephalidae.

The genus has almost cosmopolitan distribution.

Species:

- Cittotaenia denticulata (Rudolphi, 1804)
- Cittotaenia krishnai Nama, 1972
