= Choanotaenia =

Scientific classification
- Kingdom: Animalia
- Phylum: Platyhelminthes
- Class: Cestoda
- Order: Cyclophyllidea
- Family: Dilepididae
- Genus: Choanotaenia; Railliet, 1896

Genus of flatworms

Choanotaenia is a genus of flatworms belonging to the family Dilepididae.

The genus has cosmopolitan distribution.

Species:

- Choanotaenia cylindrocephala Sawada & Kugi, 1987
- Choanotaenia didiplogona Dubinina & Dubinin, 1940
- Choanotaenia estavarensis Euzet & Jourdane, 1968
- Choanotaenia fortunata (Meggitt, 1927)
- Choanotaenia ibanezi Rego & Vicente, 1968
- Choanotaenia infundibuliformis (Goeze, 1782)
- Choanotaenia infundibulum (Bloch, 1779)
- Choanotaenia littoriae De Muro, 1934
- Choanotaenia microphallos (Krabbe, 1869)
- Choanotaenia mollis (Volz, 1900)
- Choanotaenia orioli Joyeux & Baer, 1955
- Choanotaenia passerellae Cooper, 1921
- Choanotaenia pirinica Georgiev, Kornyushin & Genov, 1987
- Choanotaenia platycephala (Rudolphi, 1809)
- Choanotaenia plegadis Dubinina & Dubinin, 1940
- Choanotaenia polyorchis (Klaptocz, 1908)
- Choanotaenia rostrata (Fuhrmann, 1918)
- Choanotaenia scythica Kornyushin, Salamatin & Swiderski, 2002
- Choanotaenia soricina (Cholodkowsky, 1900)
- Choanotaenia strigium Joyeux & Timon-David, 1934
- Choanotaenia sylvarum Oliger, 1950
- Choanotaenia thraciensis Kamburov, 1969
- Choanotaenia trapezoides (Fuhrmann, 1906)
- Choanotaenia tubirostellata Sawada & Harada, 1989
- Choanotaenia uncinata Fuhrmann, 1918
