= Avitellina =

Scientific classification
- Kingdom: Animalia
- Phylum: Platyhelminthes
- Class: Cestoda
- Order: Cyclophyllidea
- Family: Anoplocephalidae
- Genus: Avitellina; Gough, 1911

Genus of flatworms

Avitellina is a genus of tapeworms belonging to the family Anoplocephalidae.

Species:

- Avitellina bangaonensis Malhotra & Capoor, 1982
- Avitellina centripunctata (Rivolta, 1874)
- Avitellina hircusae Kale, Barote & Pawar, 2005
- Avitellina pygargi (Cholodkovsky, 1902)
