= Amoebotaenia =

Scientific classification
- Kingdom: Animalia
- Phylum: Platyhelminthes
- Class: Cestoda
- Order: Cyclophyllidea
- Family: Dilepididae
- Genus: Amoebotaenia; Cohn, 1899

Synonyms
- Amaebotaenia Railliet & Henry, 1909; Ameobotaenia Kowalewski, 1902

Genus of flatworms

Amoebotaenia is a genus of tapeworms belonging to the family Dilepididae.

The genus has almost cosmopolitan distribution.

Species:

- Amoebotaenia cuneata (von Linstow, 1872)
- Amoebotaenia subterranea Cholodkovsky, 1906
- Amoebotaenia urotrichi Sawada & Harada, 1990
- Amoebotaenia vanelli Fuhrm., 1907
