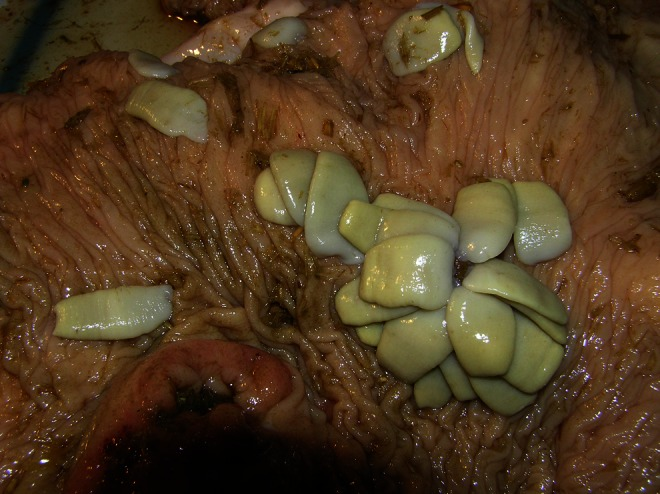
- A. perfoliata on horse

Scientific classification
- Kingdom: Animalia
- Phylum: Platyhelminthes
- Class: Cestoda
- Order: Cyclophyllidea
- Family: Anoplocephalidae
- Genus: Anoplocephala; Blanchard, 1848

Type species
- A. perfoliata

Species
- A. magna; A. manubriata; A. perfoliata; A. rhodesiensis

= Anoplocephala =

Genus of flatworms

Anoplocephala is a genus of tapeworms in the family Anoplocephalidae named in 1848 by Émile Blanchard. The type species is Anoplocephala perfoliata, which was originally described as Taenia perfoliata. Anoplocephala is a cestode, belonging to the Cestoda class, meaning that it is a Flatworm parasite. They can be found in fifty-six percent of the wild rhino population in Assam, India.
