= Caryophyllaeidae =

Scientific classification
- Kingdom: Animalia
- Phylum: Platyhelminthes
- Class: Cestoda
- Order: Caryophyllidea
- Family: Caryophyllaeidae

Family of flatworms

Caryophyllaeidae is a family of flatworms belonging to the order Caryophyllidea.

== Genera ==
Genera:

- Bialovarium Fischthal, 1953
- Calentinella Mackiewicz, 1974
- Caryophyllaeus Gmelin, 1790
- Caryophyllaeus Müller, 1787
- Dieffluvium Williams, 1978
- Glaridacris Cooper, 1920
- Homeomorpha Dutton & Barger, 2014
- Janiszewskella Mackiewicz & Deutsch, 1976
- Monobothrium Diesing, 1863
- Paracaryophyllaeus Kulakovskaya, 1961
- Paraglaridacris Janiszewska, 1950
- Penarchigetes Mackiewicz, 1969
- Pliovitellaria Fischthal, 1951
- Promonobothrium Mackiewicz, 1968
- Rogersus Williams, 1980
- Rowardleus Mackiewicz & Deutsch, 1976
- Wenyonia Woodland, 1923
