= Archigetes =

Scientific classification
- Kingdom: Animalia
- Phylum: Platyhelminthes
- Class: Cestoda
- Order: Caryophyllidea
- Family: Capingentidae
- Genus: Archigetes; Leuckart, 1878,

Genus of tapeworms

Archigetes is a genus of tapeworms, that is unique among all tapeworms in that its species can mature in invertebrate hosts (Oligochaeta), in contrast to all other cestodes which have a vertebrate host. All five species were described as plerocercoids in oligochaetes, but two of them were also described as adults in cypriniform fishes.

== Species ==
According to WoRMS, there are five valid species:

- Archigetes brachyurus Mrázek, 1908
- Archigetes cryptobothrius Wiśniewski, 1928
- Archigetes iowensis Calentine, 1962
- Archigetes limnodrili (Yamaguti, 1934) Kennedy, 1965
- Archigetes sieboldi Leuckart, 1878
