= Vancouver Island marmot =

- Mount Washington Alpine Resort; British Columbia, Canada

Conservation status
- Critically Endangered (IUCN 3.1)

- Critically Imperiled (NatureServe)

Scientific classification
- Kingdom: Animalia
- Phylum: Chordata
- Class: Mammalia
- Order: Rodentia
- Family: Sciuridae
- Genus: Marmota
- Subgenus: Marmota (Petromarmota)
- Species: M. vancouverensis

Binomial name
- Marmota vancouverensis (Swarth, 1911)
- Current distribution Former distribution

Species of rodent

The Vancouver Island marmot (Marmota vancouverensis) is a species of marmot endemic to Vancouver Island, in British Columbia.

== Distribution ==
M. vancouverensis lives above 1,000 metres (3,300 ft) elevation in meadows that face south to west, and habitat scarceness is believed to be the primary reason for its rarity.

Marmot surveys have been conducted on Vancouver Island since 1979. Beginning in the 1980s, this species experienced an 80–90% decline in population, such that by 2006 only 32 adults remained in the wild. Since that time, the population has begun to increase as a result of an ongoing program to restore wild populations of this unique Canadian species. As of the fall of 2021, there were just over 250 wild marmots living in 25 colonies distributed between two metapopulations, and one isolated colony at Steamboat Mountain.

== Description ==
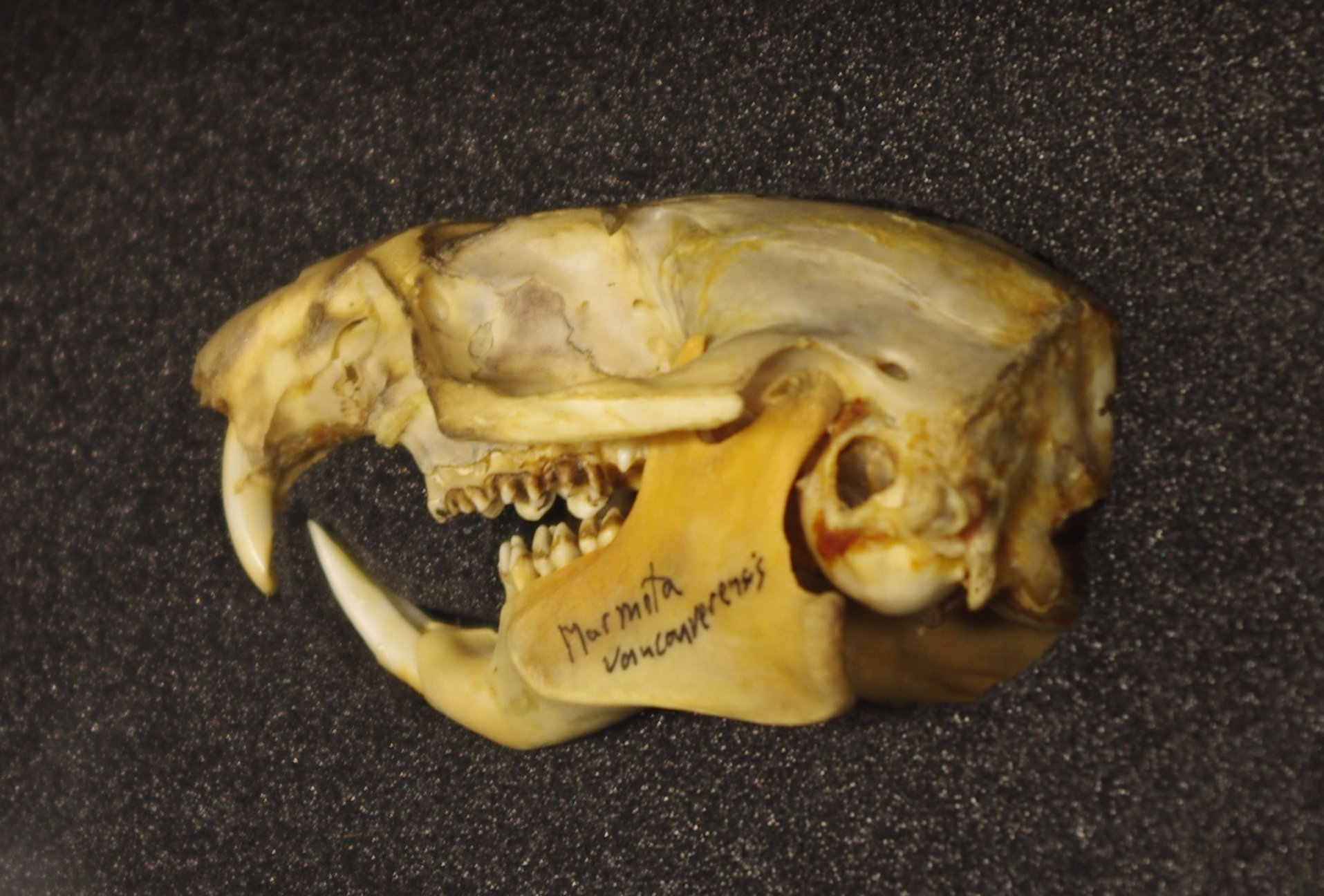
Vancouver Island marmot skull

M. vancouverensis is typical of marmots in phenotype. It can however be distinguished from other marmots by its chocolate brown fur and contrasting white patches. The only species of marmot endemic to Vancouver Island, it apparently evolved rapidly since the retreat of the Cordilleran ice sheet some 10,000 years ago. It is distinct from other marmot species in terms of morphology, genetics, behaviour, and ecology.

An adult Vancouver Island marmot typically measures 65 to 70 centimetres (26 to 28 in) from the tip of its nose to the tip of its tail. However, weights show tremendous seasonal variation. An adult female that weighs 3 kilograms (6.6 lb) when she emerges from hibernation in late April can weigh 4.5 to 5.5 kg (9.9 to 12.1 lb) by the onset of hibernation in late September or October. Adult males can be even larger, reaching weights of over 7.5 kg (17 lb). In general, marmots lose about one-third of their body mass during the six-and-a-half months in which they hibernate during winter.

== Behaviour ==
Like all marmots, the Vancouver Island marmot is exclusively herbivorous. Over 30 varieties of plants have been observed being consumed by marmots on Vancouver Island, who typically switch from grasses in the early spring to plants like lupines in the late summer. Marmots hibernate for various amounts of time depending upon site characteristics and weather conditions. Wild Vancouver Island marmots hibernate, on average, for about 210 days of the year, generally from late September or early October until late April or early May. They generally hibernate for shorter periods in captivity.

Vancouver Island marmots typically first breed at three or four years of age, although some have been observed to breed as two-year-olds. Male marmots have been noticed to mate with 2 or more females during mating season. Marmots breed soon after emergence from hibernation. Gestation is thought to be approximately 30–35 days. Litter sizes average 1–6 pups every other year, and weaned pups generally emerge above ground for the first time in early July.

== Conservation status ==
Causes of marmot population declines are numerous. Over the long term (i.e., periods involving thousands of years), climate changes have caused both increases and declines of open alpine habitat that constitute suitable marmot habitat. Over more recent time scales, population dynamics may have been influenced by short-term weather patterns and systematic changes in the landscape. In particular, forest clearcutting at low elevations likely altered dispersal patterns. Sub-adult marmots typically disperse from the subalpine meadows in which they were born. Dispersal involves traversing lowland conifer forests and valleys to other subalpine meadows. However, clearcutting has provided marmots with new open areas which constitute habitat. Unfortunately, rapid forest regeneration makes such man-made habitats unsuitable over a few years. One study concluded that clearcuts therefore act as a kind of population "sink" in which long-term reproduction and survival rates are reduced to the point of unsustainability. One 2005 study concluded the main cause of recent decline to be predation "associated with forestry and altered predator abundance and hunting patterns". This study also revealed seasonal variations in mortality rates, where the probability of death was low during hibernation, and high in August. Major predators upon Vancouver Island marmots include golden eagles (Aquila chrysaetos), cougars (Puma concolor) and wolves (Canis lupus).

The population crash may also be due to the Allee effect, named after zoologist Warder Clyde Allee. Allee proposed that social animals require a critical mass in order to survive, because survival requires group activities, such as warning of predators and migration. A decline below that threshold precipates rapid decline. Ecologist Justin Brashares suggests that at least some of the marmot's group behavior is learned, so that the loss of marmot "culture" has caused them to become more solitary, and interact aggressively rather than cooperatively when they do encounter each other.

The Vancouver Island marmot remains one of the world's rarest mammals. By 1997 their population had declined to the point that it became necessary to capture several individuals to create a "genetic lifeboat" for the eventual restoration of the wild population. The first marmots went to Toronto Zoo in 1997, and others were later sent to the Calgary Zoo and Mountainview Conservation and Breeding Centre in Langley, British Columbia.

In 1998 a new model for species recovery was developed involving the collaboration of government, private industry and public donors. A census in late 2003 resulted in a count of only 21 wild marmots known to be present on four mountains of Vancouver Island. After these findings, marmots were released from captivity in different places to try to get the population back up to a reasonable number.

These marmots are still classified as endangered. The cumulative captive breeding program has steadily grown, with 130 individuals in captivity (2010) and 442 weaned pups born in captivity since 2000. A number of individuals have been released to Strathcona Provincial Park, Mount Cain, Mount Washington and more southern mountains. The Marmot Recovery Foundation has built a dedicated marmot facility on Mount Washington to further facilitate captive breeding and pre-release conditioning. Between 2003 and 2010, the Marmot Recovery Foundation and the British Columbia Ministry of Environment have released 308 marmots back into the wild. More releases are expected in the upcoming years to increase the wild population, estimated at 250–300 individuals in 2010, and 350–400 individuals in 2013. The wild population was counted at 250 in 2021. In 2026, the estimated number of marmots is around 427, though breeding efforts continue.

Due to conservation and recovery efforts, the population of Vancouver Island marmots has significantly increased since 2003. Nevertheless, Vancouver Island marmot populations continue to fluctuate due to natural events as well as increased predation.

== Related species ==
Based on genetic analyses, the closest relatives of the Vancouver Island marmot are the hoary marmot (M. caligata) and the Olympic marmot (M. olympus). There is some debate, on genetic grounds, about which of the two nearby mainland species is most closely related to the Vancouver Island marmot or when marmots first arrived on the island. The differences in DNA observed between species is small. In 2009, Nagorsen and Cardini identified, from museum specimens, substantial physical differences between species that can be explained only by rapid evolution in a relatively isolated island context.

== In popular culture ==
Because of their endangered status, Vancouver Island marmots have become a conservation symbol in British Columbia.

- Mukmuk, "sidekick" to the three official mascots for the 2010 Winter Olympics and Paralympics, is portrayed as a member of the species.
- The Victoria Royals hockey team mascot, "Marty the Marmot", is based on the Vancouver Island marmot, which the team created to represent the importance of the species to the Vancouver Island region. The marmot was also the former mascot of the now defunct Victoria Salmon Kings hockey team.
- Wild marmots: Chopper, Marlu, and Van Isle Violet, Groundhog Day forecast, via the Marmot Recovery Foundation at Nanaimo, Vancouver Island.

In 2023 the Vancouver Island marmot was featured on a United States Postal Service forever stamp as part of the Endangered Species set, based on a photograph from Joel Sartore's Photo Ark. The stamp was dedicated at a ceremony at the National Grasslands Visitor Center in Wall, South Dakota.
