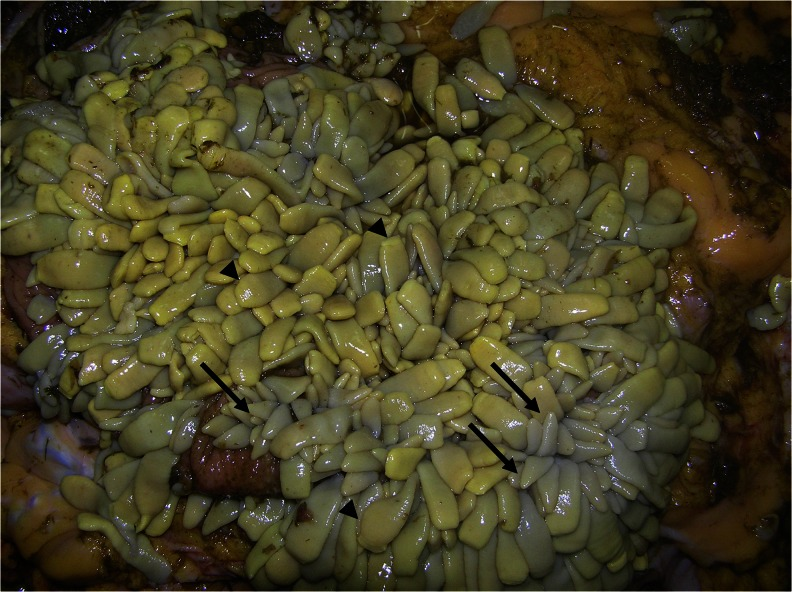
- Beginning of patent period during the invasion of Anoplocephala perfoliata on a horse. Immature tapeworms (arrows) and tapeworms with gravid segments (arrow heads)

Scientific classification
- Kingdom: Animalia
- Phylum: Platyhelminthes
- Class: Cestoda
- Order: Cyclophyllidea
- Family: Anoplocephalidae
- Genus: Anoplocephala
- Species: A. perfoliata

Binomial name
- Anoplocephala perfoliata (Goeze, 1782)

= Anoplocephala perfoliata =

Species of flatworm

Anoplocephala perfoliata is the most common intestinal tapeworm of horses, and an agent responsible for some cases of equine colic.

== Description ==
Between 8 and 25 centimeters long, Anoplocephala perfoliata is part of the order Cyclophillidea and is one of the three tapeworm species that can infect horses. This parasite is the most common intestinal tapeworm of horses in the world and is one of the top causes of equine colic. Any horses that have access to pastures and grazing are likely to have an A. perfoliata tapeworm in their body and experience no symptoms. The other two species which can infect horses are A. magna and Paranoplocephala mamillana. A. perfoliata can be found in the intestinal tract of a horse at the ileocecal junction as well within the cecum and the ileum themselves.

== Life cycle ==
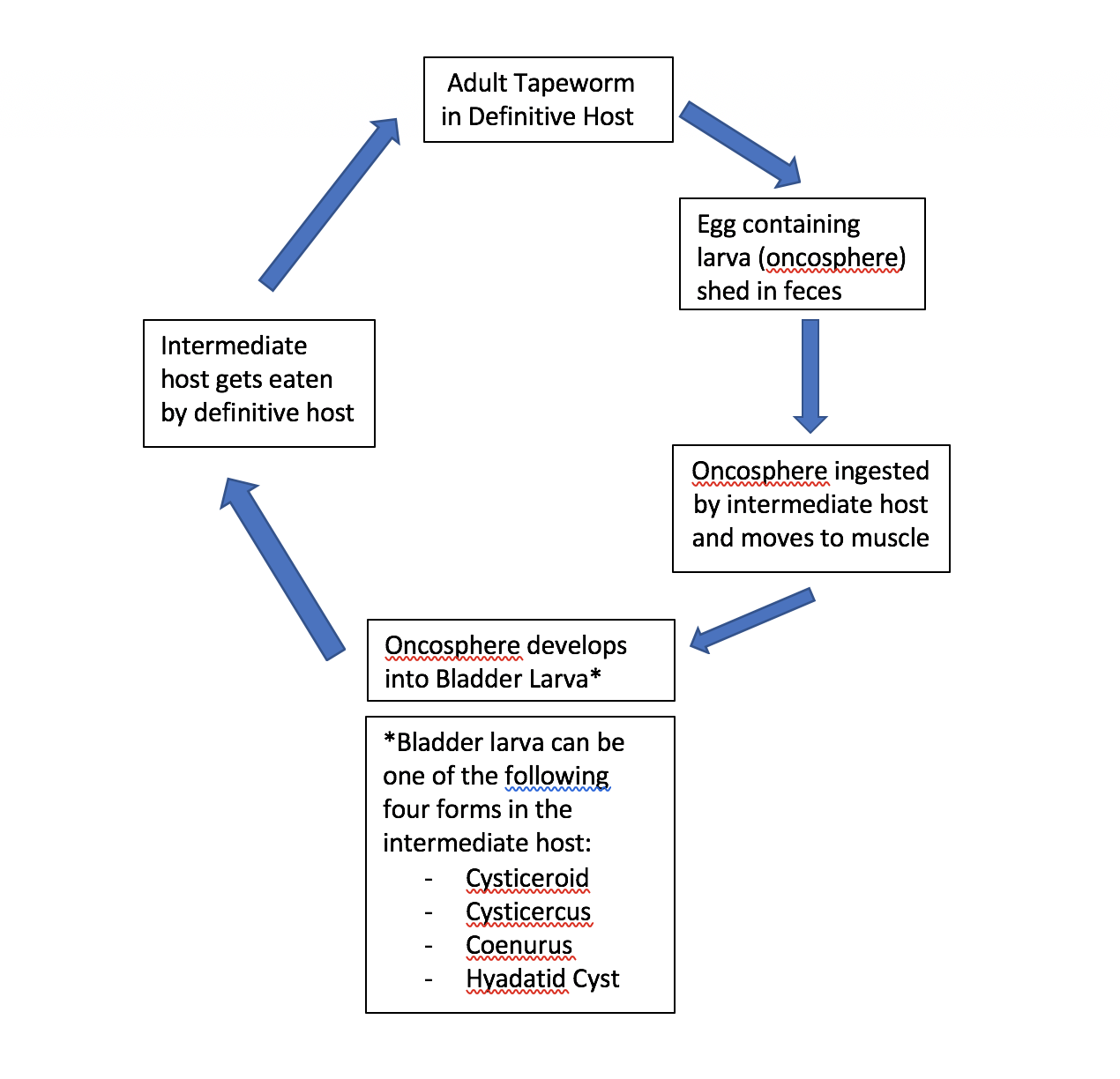
Life cycle

This parasite follows the general Cyclophillidean life cycle diagrammed in Figure 1. These parasites prefer rich, grassy areas and are not often found in arid, desert climate areas such as Arizona. This life cycle is indirect, and requires an intermediate host, typically an oribatid mite which lives on vegetation. The eggs from the adult worms are passed in the feces into the pasture which the mite then consumes. While in the mite, the eggs develop into larvae until this mite is consumed by a horse eating grass.

== Pathology ==
A light infection within a horse will likely not exhibit any symptoms of infection. However, a horse with a heavy infection can experience GI issues, weakness and anemia. Immunocompromised horses (ex: extremely old and extremely young) can have only a light parasite load, but experience infection symptoms associated with extreme pathology. The tapeworm perforating through the intestinal wall and ulcerating the mucosal layer of the stomach at the site of attachment has also been seen with this parasite leading to the intussusception. Horses that have cases of infection Anoplocephala perfoliata are at an increased risk of suffering from colic while infected and after being treated. An infected horse can also suffer from peritonitis (inflammation of the peritoneum) as well as secondary infections and abscesses at the site of attachment. Impaction of the intestine is also a possible symptom. In rare cases, the intestinal tract itself can twist and even rupture.

== Diagnosis ==
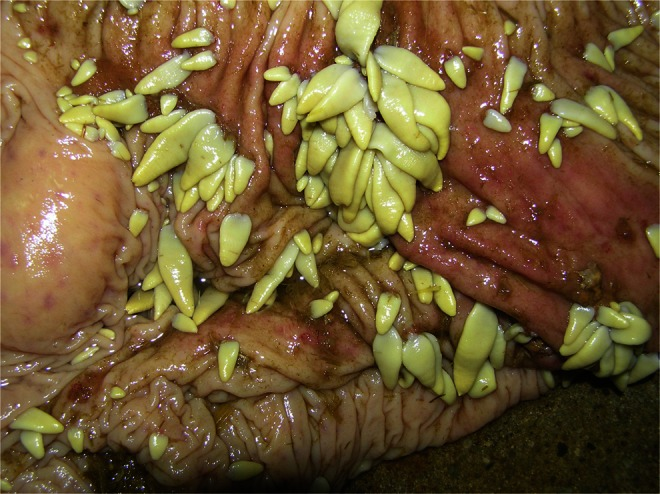
Infection due to Anoplocephala perfoliata

A fecal float can diagnose the presence of an infection however they may not always be present in a sample, especially if the host has a light infection. Proglottids are released on an irregular basis as well therefore multiple tests may need to be in order to confirm an infection of Anoplocephala perfoliata. Immunodiagnostic methods can be used, however they do not reliably distinguish between the two species of genus Anoplocephala which infect horses.

== Treatment ==
The typical Pyrantel pamoate (pyrantel salts) dose of 6.6 mg per kilogram. At this dose, the treatment is anywhere between 80-87% effective. Doubling this dose only increases the overall efficacy to 93-95%.

Praziquantel at a dose of 1 mg per kg is 89-100% effective at eliminating an infection of Anoplocephala perfoliata. Ivermectin or Moxidectin in combination with Praziquantel are extremely effective against this parasite.

No documentation of resistance to these treatments has been recorded yet.

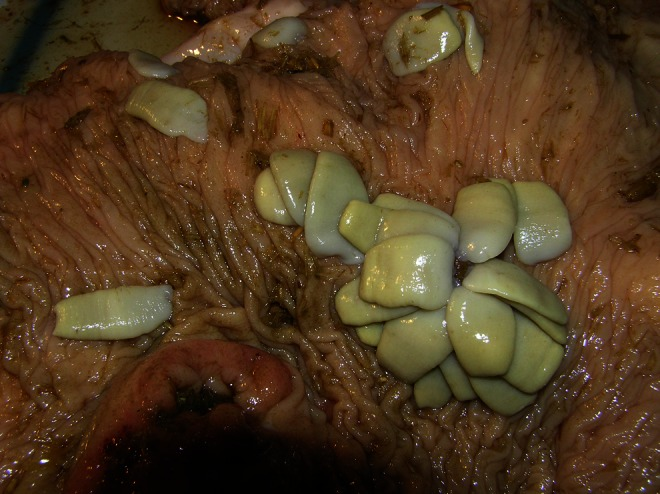
Invasion in the patent period on horse. All tapeworms with gravid segments

== Prevention ==
Horses cannot develop immunity to these parasites, so prevention is a key step in maintaining their health.

Interval deworming is a common practice among horse owners to prevent heavy parasite infections from occurring and is a safe, effective way to prevent an infection in a horse. The typical drug for this is Ivermectin.

Pyrantel salts can be administered every day that horses are grazing. The daily dose to eliminate A. perfoliata and A. magna is about 2.65 mg per kilogram.

Lastly, rather than treating every day or sporadically, horses can be dewormed right before grazing season begins and after at the end of the season in areas where horses are not out year round due to climate. This seems to be the most beneficial plan of prevention for horses as it can remove any parasites left over from the winter months and then after grazing season, eliminates the parasites they may have become infected with over the summer.

For young horses that are just getting weaned off mother's milk, tapeworm treatment is highly recommended to prevent infection, as when infection occurs this early in life, it can put them at a high risk for ileocecal colic.
