= Stilesia =

Scientific classification
- Kingdom: Animalia
- Phylum: Platyhelminthes
- Class: Cestoda
- Order: Cyclophyllidea
- Family: Anoplocephalidae
- Genus: Stilesia; Railliet, 1893

Genus of flatworms

Stilesia is a genus of flatworms belonging to the family Anoplocephalidae.

Species:

- Stilesia alii Borde & Shinde, 1999
- Stilesia ambajogaensis Pawar, Lakhe, Shinde & Patil, 2004
- Stilesia aurangabadensis (Shinde, Jadhav & Kadam, 1979)
- Stilesia aurangabadensis Majid, Shinde & Jadhav, 1982
- Stilesia caprai Patil & Menkundle, 2002
- Stilesia daulatabadensis Shelke & Shinde, 2004
- Stilesia dhondagae Deshmukh & Shinde, 2001
- Stilesia garhwalensis Malhotra & Capoor, 1983
- Stilesia globipunctata (Rivolta, 1874)
- Stilesia govindi Patil, Mahajan & Shinde, 1995
- Stilesia indica (Shinde, 1969)
- Stilesia jadhave Jadhav & Khadap, 2002
- Stilesia kaijensis (Lakhe, Patil, Shindez & Pawar, 2004)
- Stilesia kotdwarensis Malhotra & Capoor, 1983
- Stilesia marathwadaensis Shinde, Jadhav & Phad, 1986
- Stilesia mehdii Patil, Mahajan & Shinde, 1995
- Stilesia thapari Shelke & Shinde, 2004
- Stilesia yavalensis Shinde & Kalse, 1999
