= Lytocestidae =

Scientific classification
- Kingdom: Animalia
- Phylum: Platyhelminthes
- Class: Cestoda
- Order: Caryophyllidea
- Family: Lytocestidae

Family of flatworms

Lytocestidae is a family of flatworms belonging to the order Caryophyllidea.

Genera:

- Atractolytocestus Anthony, 1958
- Bovienia Fuhrmann, 1931
- Caryoaustralus Mackiewicz & Blair, 1980
