= Dilepididae =

Scientific classification
- Kingdom: Animalia
- Phylum: Platyhelminthes
- Class: Cestoda
- Order: Cyclophyllidea
- Family: Dilepididae; Railliet & Henry, 1909

Family of flatworms

Dilepididae is a family of flatworms belonging to the order Cyclophyllidea.

== Genera ==
The World Register of Marine Species accepts the following genera within Dilepididae:

- Alcataenia Spasskaya, 1971
- Amoebotaenia Cohn, 1899
- Anomotaenia Cohn, 1900
- Capsulata Sandeman, 1959
- Choanotaenia Railliet, 1896
- Dictymetra Clark, 1952
- Dilepis Weinland, 1858
- Icterotaenia Railliet & Henry, 1909
- Laritaenia Spasskaya & Spasskii, 1971
- Lateriporus Fuhrmann, 1907
- Malika Woodland, 1929
- Nototaenia Jones & Williams, 1967
- Paraliga Belopolskaja & Kulachkova, 1973
- Paricterotaenia Fuhrmann, 1932
- Parorchites Fuhrmann, 1932
- Platyscolex Spasskaya, 1962
- Pseudanomotaenia Matevosyan, 1963
- Reticulotaenia Hoberg, 1985
