= Thysaniezia =

Scientific classification
- Kingdom: Animalia
- Phylum: Platyhelminthes
- Class: Cestoda
- Order: Cyclophyllidea
- Family: Taeniidae
- Genus: Thysaniezia; Skrjabin, 1926

Genus of flatworms

Thysaniezia is a genus of flatworms belonging to the family Taeniidae.

Species:

- Thysaniezia aspinosa Nama, 1972
- Thysaniezia himalayai Fotedar & Bambroo, 1977
- Thysaniezia ovilla (Rivolta, 1878)
