= Anoplocephala magna =

Scientific classification
- Kingdom: Animalia
- Phylum: Platyhelminthes
- Class: Cestoda
- Order: Cyclophyllidea
- Family: Anoplocephalidae
- Genus: Anoplocephala
- Species: A. magna

Binomial name
- Anoplocephala magna (Abildgaard, 1789)

Synonyms
- Taenia magna Abildgaard, 1789

Species of flatworm

Anoplocephala magna is a species of flatworm belonging to the family Anoplocephalidae.

The species has almost cosmopolitan distribution.
