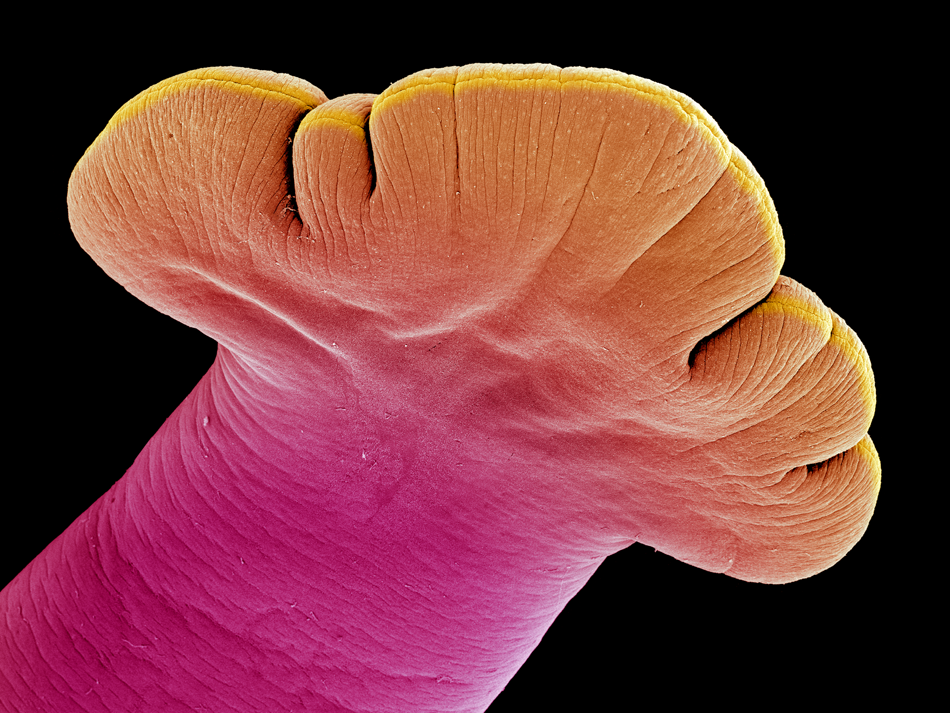

Scientific classification
- Kingdom: Animalia
- Phylum: Platyhelminthes
- Class: Cestoda
- Subclass: Eucestoda
- Order: Caryophyllidea; Van Beneden in Carus, 1863

= Caryophyllidea =

Order of flatworms

The Caryophyllideans are a group of tapeworms that infect fish and annelids (segmented worms) with a simple scolex or "head." Worms in this order only have one proglottid, which is believed to be the primitive condition for tapeworms. They are generally less than 10 centimetres long. Caryophillideans represent a unique type of tapeworm, such that they possess a monzoic, unsegmented, body, with only a single set of reproductive organs.

In the Caryophyllidean life cycle, adults live in fish, who pass the tapeworm eggs in their feces. Annelids eat the eggs, where they hatch into oncosphere larvae that move through intestinal wall and become procercoid larvae in the body cavity. When the annelid is eaten by a fish, the tapeworm matures. Catfish, suckers, and minnows are among the fishes that can serve as definitive hosts.

The genus Archigetes Leuckart, 1878, a caryophyllidean, is unique among all tapeworms in that its species can mature in invertebrate hosts (Oligochaeta), i.e. have a monoxenic (direct) life cycle.

== Classification ==
According to WoRMS, the Caryophyllidea include four families:

- Family Balanotaeniidae Mackiewicz & Blair, 1978
- Family Capingentidae Hunter, 1930
- Family Caryophyllaeidae Leuckart, 1878
- Family Lytocestidae Hunter, 1927
