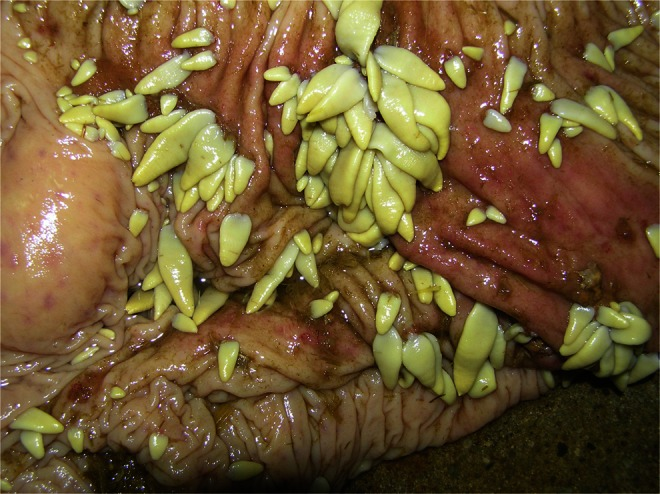
- Anoplocephala perfoliata on horse

Scientific classification
- Kingdom: Animalia
- Phylum: Platyhelminthes
- Class: Cestoda
- Order: Cyclophyllidea
- Family: Anoplocephalidae; Cholodkovsky, 1902

= Anoplocephalidae =

Family of flatworms

The Anoplocephalidae are a family of tapeworms containing the genera Bertiella, Anoplocephala, Paranoplocephala, Moniezia, and others.

== Genera ==
Genera:

- Afrobaeria Haukisalmi, 2008
- Afrojoyeuxia Haukisalmi, 2013
- Andrya Railliet, 1893
- Anoplocephala Blanchard, 1848
- Anoplocephaloides Baer, 1923
- Anoplocephaloides Rausch, 1976
- Aporina Fuhrmann, 1902
- Arctocestus Haukisalmi, Hardman, Hoberg & Henttonen, 2014
- Atriotaenia Sandground, 1926
- Avitellina Gough, 1911
- Beringitaenia Haukisalmi, Hardman, Hoberg & Henttonen, 2014
- Bertiella Stiles & Hassell, 1902
- Biporonterina Burt, 1973
- Bulbultaenia Beveridge, 1994
- Bulbutaenia Beveridge, 1994
- Chionocestus Haukisalmi, Hardman, Hoberg & Henttonen, 2014
- Cittotaenia Riehm, 1881
- Cleberia Arandos Rêgo, 1967
- Coelodela Shipley, 1900
- Cookiella Haukisalmi, Hardman, Hoberg & Henttonen, 2014
- Crossotaenia Mahon, 1954
- Ctenotaenia Railliet, 1893
- Cycloskrjabinia Spasskii, 1951
- Damanocephala Spassky & Buga, 2007
- Diandrya Darrah, 1930
- Diuterinotaenia Gvozdev, 1961
- Doublesetina Srivastava & Srivastav, 1989
- Douthittia Haukisalmi, Hardman, Hoberg & Henttonen, 2014
- Echidnotaenia Beveridge, 1980
- Ectopocephalium Rausch & Ohbayashi, 1974
- ??? Equinia Haukisalmi, 2009
- Eurotaenia Haukisalmi, Hardman, Hoberg & Henttonen, 2014
- Flabelloskrjabinia Spasskii, 1951
- Francolina Capoor, Sawada, Bhalya & Rastogi, 1987
- Gallegoides Tenora & Mas-Coma, 1978
- Gekkotaenia Bursey, Goldberg & Kraus, 2005
- Genovia Haukisalmi, 2009
- Gulyaevia Haukisalmi, Hardman, Hoberg & Henttonen, 2014
- Hemiparonia Baer, 1925
- Hickmawia Spasskii, 1987
- Hokkaidocephala Tenora, Gulyaev & Kamiya, 1999
- Hunkeleriella Haukisalmi, 2013
- Inermicapsifer Janicki, 1910
- Inermicapsiper Janicki, 1910
- Killigrewia Meggitt, 1927
- Lemminia Haukisalmi, Hardman, Hoberg & Henttonen, 2014
- Leporidotaenia Genov, Murai, Georgiev & Harris, 1990
- Linstowia Zschokke, 1899
- Marmotocephala Gvozdev, Zhigileva & Gulyaev, 2004
- Mathevotaenia Akhumyan, 1946
- Metacapsifer Spasskii, 1951
- Microcephaloides Haukisalmi, Hardman, Hardman, Rausch & Henttonen, 2008
- Microticola Haukisalmi, Hardman, Hoberg & Henttonen, 2014
- Moniezia Blanchard, 1891
- Moniezoides Fuhrmann, 1918
- Monoecocestus Beddard, 1914
- Mosgovoyia Spasskii, 1951
- Multicapsiferina Fuhrmann, 1922
- Neandrya Haukisalmi & Wickström, 2005
- Neoaporina Saxena & Baugh, 1973
- Neoctenotaenia Tenora, 1976
- Oochoristica Lühe, 1898
- Panceriella Stunkard, 1969
- Paralinstowia Baer, 1927
- Paramonieza
- Paramoniezia Maplestone & Southwell, 1923
- Parandrya Gulyaev & Chechulin, 1996
- Paranoplocephala Lühe, 1910
- Paranoplocephaloides Gulyaev, 1996
- Parasciurotaenia Haukisalmi, 2009
- Paronia Diamare, 1900
- Paucicapsula Kugi, 1993
- Pericapsifer Spasski, 1951
- Pericpasifer Spasskii, 1951
- Phascolocestus Beveridge, 2014
- Phascolotaenia Beveridge, 1976
- Pritchardia Gardner, Agustín Jimenez & Campbell, 2013
- Progamotaenia Nybelin, 1917
- Pseudocittotaenia Tenora, 1976
- Pulluterina Smithers, 1954
- Rauschoides Haukisalmi, Hardman, Hoberg & Henttonen, 2014
- Rodentocestus Haukisalmi, Hardman, Hoberg & Henttonen, 2014
- Schizorchis Hansen, 1948
- Schizorchodes Bienek & Grundmann, 1973
- Sciurotaenia Haukisalmi, 2009
- ??? Semenoviella Spasski, 1951
- Shindeia Gaikwad & Shinde, 1985
- Shindeoandrya Shinde, Mahajan, Mahajan & Begum, 1999
- Sinaiotaenia Wertheim & Greenberg, 1971
- Spasskofuhrmina Palladwar & Kalyankar, 1989
- Stilesia Railliet, 1893
- Stringopotaenia Beveridge, 1978
- Taufikia Woodland, 1928
- Tenoraia Haukisalmi, Hardman, Hoberg & Henttonen, 2014
- Thysaniezia Skryabin, 1926
- Thysanosoma Diesing, 1835
- Thysanotaenia Beddard, 1911
- Timorenia Spasskii, 1987
- Triplotaenia Boas, 1902
- Triuterina Fuhrmann, 1922
- Tupaiataenia Schmidt & File, 1977
- Viscachataenia Denegri, Dophic, Elissondo & Beveridge, 2003
- Wallabicestus Schmidt, 1975
- Witenbergitaenia Wertheim, Schmidt & Greenberg, 1986
- Wyominia Scott, 1941
- ??? Zschokkea Fuhrmann, 1902
- Zschokkeella Ransom, 1909
