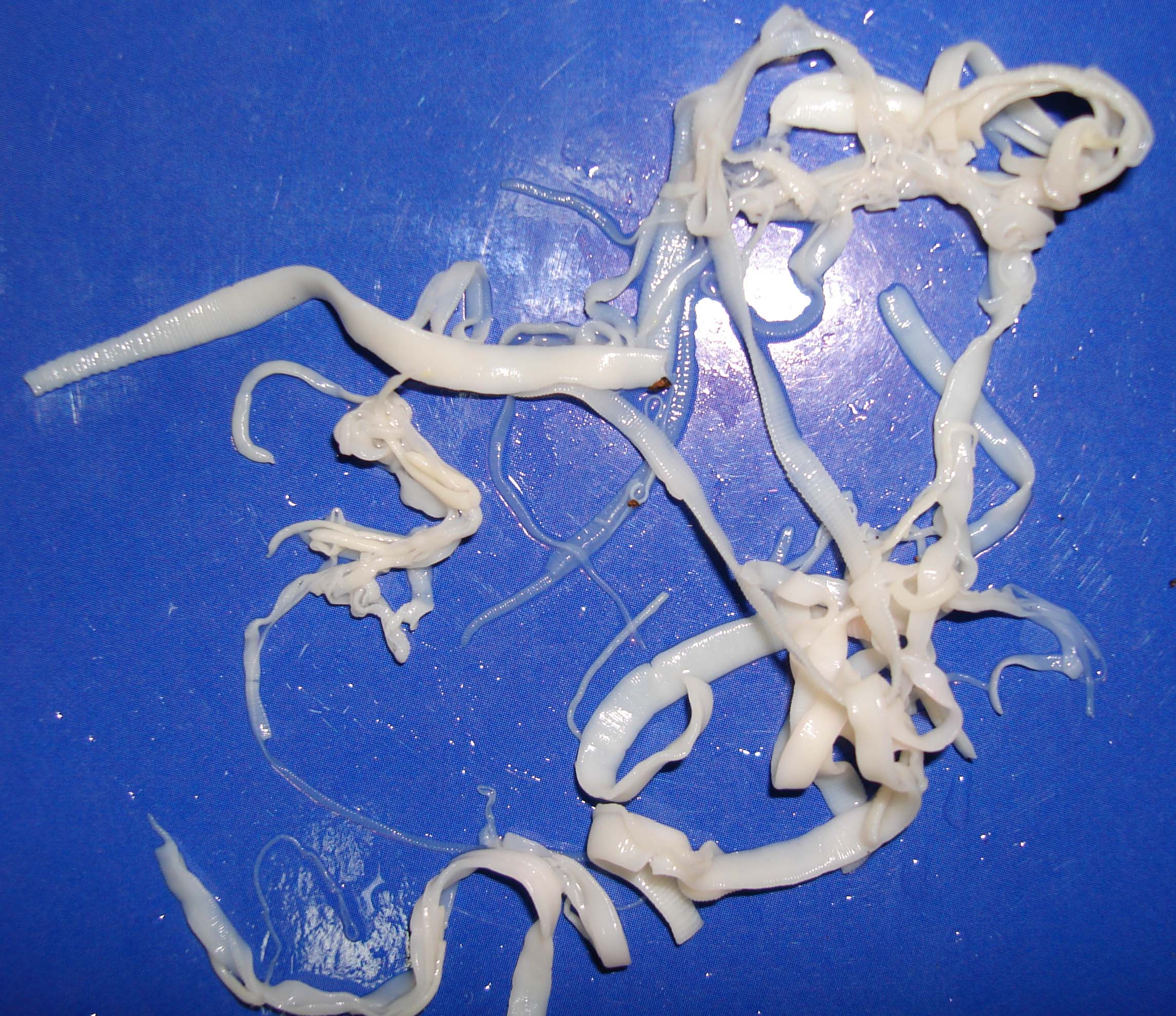
- Adult Raillietina echinobothrida

Scientific classification
- Kingdom: Animalia
- Phylum: Platyhelminthes
- Class: Cestoda
- Order: Cyclophyllidea
- Family: Davaineidae
- Genus: Raillietina
- Species: R. echinobothrida

Binomial name
- Raillietina echinobothrida Mégnin, 1880

= Raillietina echinobothrida =

Species of flatworm

Raillietina echinobothrida is a parasitic tapeworm belonging to the class Cestoda. It is the most prevalent and pathogenic helminth parasite in birds, particularly in domestic fowl, Gallus domesticus Linnaeus, 1758. It requires two hosts, birds and ants, for completion of its life cycle. It is a hermaphrodite worm having both the male and female reproductive organs in its body. The parasite is responsible for 'nodular tapeworm disease' in poultry.

== Description ==
The body of an adult R. echinobothrida is a characteristic tapeworm structure, composed of a series of ribbon-like body segments, gradually enlarging from the anterior end towards the posterior. It is whitish in colour, highly elongated, dorsoventrally flattened, and entirely covered with a tegument. The body can be as long as 25 cm, and generally 1–1.5 cm broad. The body is divisible into the head region called 'scolex', followed by an unsegmented 'neck', and then by highly segmented body proper called 'strobila'. The scolex bears four suckers and a rostellum, which are the organs of attachment to the host. Individual segments in the strobila are called 'proglottids' and are entirely covered with hair-like 'microtriches'. These microtriches are the absorptive structures for feeding, and there are no digestive organs. A number of testes and a pair ovaries are present in each proglottid. Each mature body segment contains 8-12 egg capsules.

== Life cycle ==
It completes its life cycle in two different hosts. The adult life is spent in the intestine of fowl, which is the definitive host, and juvenile period is in ant, particularly the species of Tetramorium, which is the intermediate host. Gravid proglottids containing a large number of egg capsules are passed out to the exterior with the feces of infested chicken. Each egg capsule in turn contains 3 to 8 eggs. The larvae called onchospheres are ingested by ants, and enters the alimentary canal, from where they migrate into the abdominal cavity of the insect and develop into mature cysticercoids, the infective larvae to birds.

== Pathogenicity and pathology ==
The adult parasite infects the small intestine of fowl, from where it obtains nutrition from the digested food of the host. The tapeworm is responsible for stunted growth of young chicken, emaciation of adult and decreased egg production of hen. In general the tapeworm does not cause gross pathological damages on well-nourished chicken, but do compete for food when they grow to excessive number. In such situation, severe lesions on the intestinal walls and diarrhoea could arise, which ostensibly resulted in ill health. Under heavy infestation, R. echinobothrida is listed as one of the most pathogenic tapeworms, causing conspicuous intestinal nodules in chicken, with characteristic hyperplastic enteritis associated with the formation of granuloma. The symptom is termed “nodular tapeworm disease” in poultry. Intestinal nodules often result in degeneration and necrosis of intestinal villi, accompanied by anaemia with a significant increase of total leukocyte counts and decrease of total serum protein. The nodules can measure up to 6 mm in diameter, which can be seen as rugged swellings on autopsy, and often cause catarrh and enteritis.

== Treatment ==
There is no prescription drug for the parasite. Naturally infected hens were dewormed completely in 24 hours using mebendazole orally at doses 25 mg/kg body weight and higher, without apparent sideeffect. Albendazole was shown to be highly effective and is advocated as the drug of choice.
