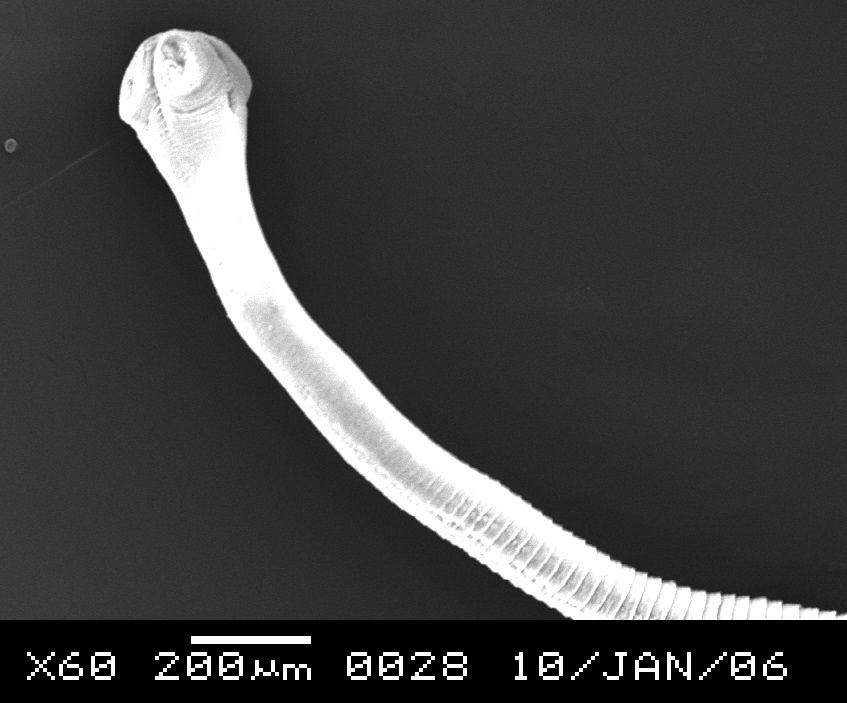
- Raillietina tetragona anterior part

Scientific classification
- Kingdom: Animalia
- Phylum: Platyhelminthes
- Class: Cestoda
- Order: Cyclophyllidea
- Family: Davaineidae
- Genus: Raillietina
- Species: R. tetragona

Binomial name
- Raillietina tetragona (Molin, 1858)

= Raillietina tetragona =

Species of flatworm

Raillietina tetragona (synonym Taenia tetragona Molin) is a parasitic tapeworm belonging to the class Cestoda. It is a cosmopolitan helminth of the small intestine of pigeon, chicken and guinea fowl, and is found throughout the world.

It is a very typical of cestode with striking resemblance to other species of Raillietina. Its identifying features are, therefore, mainly on the neck and scolex structures. In addition, it is relatively large, and requires ant as intermediate host to complete its life cycle.

== Description ==
Raillietina tetragona is the largest among avian tapeworms, measuring up to 30 cm in length and 1–1.5 cm in breadth. It is whitish in colour, highly elongated, dorso-ventrally flattened, and entirely covered with a tegument. The body is divisible into the head region called 'scolex', followed by an unsegmented 'neck', and then by highly segmented body proper called strobila. The strobila is composed of a series of ribbon-like body segments called proglottids, gradually enlarging from the anterior end towards the posterior. The scolex bears an apical rounded rostellum, which is armed with 100 minute hooks, arranged in single row. This is surrounded by four suckers which are lined with 5-6 rows of spines. The most important diagnostic characters in comparison to other species are oval scolex and suckers, with relatively elongated neck.

Raillietina tetragona is strictly hermaphroditic having a complete reproductive system in itself. Each mature proglottid has a set of male and female reproductive organ and genital pores on one side. Testes are located on both sides of the ovary and behind vitellarium. Each egg capsule contained 4-12 eggs and many calcareous corpuscles, each of which is surrounded by a membrane. The male reproductive system matures first. As the two reproductive systems matured, the proglottids became gravid after fertilization.

== Life cycle ==
The tapeworm completes its life cycle in two different hosts, the definitive host being birds, and the intermediate hosts are ant, particularly the species of Tetramorium, and housefly of the species Pheidole and Musca, in which the cysticerdoids develop. In Sudan the intermediate host is exclusively of the ant Pachycondyla sennaarensis. Ant species of Leptothorax are also known to harbour the juvenile stages. The sequence of development in the intermediate host comprises 5 stages, namely (1) oncosphere stage, (2) lacuna stage, (3) cystic cavity stage, (4) scolex formation stage and (5) cysticercoid stage. In birds, the gravid proglottids containing a large number of egg capsules are passed out to the exterior with the feces. The eggs grow on soil into larvae called onchospheres, which are ingested by ants, and enters the alimentary canal, from where they migrates into the abdominal cavity of the host.

== Pathogenicity and pathology ==
The adult parasite infects the small intestine of fowl, from where it obtains nutrition from the digested food of the host. Even though there are rumours of heavy infections leading to death, there are no factual scientific reports. Generally the parasite is quite harmless, and does not cause serious lesions under natural conditions. However, instances of reduced weight loss and decreased production of eggs are observed in experimental infections. Pathological symptoms include reduced glycogen in the liver and intestinal mucosa, enteritis, hemoglobin depression, lymphocyte and macrophage infiltration, reduced total white blood cells.

== Diagnosis and treatment ==
Infection is diagnosed by identifying proglottids in the faeces. Dibutyltin dilaurate is one of the earliest drugs found to be effective. Commercially, praziquantel (such as Ezotec® 10 at the dosage of 6.00 mg/kg of body weight, in a single dose) is the drug of choice. It is 100% effective at 10 mg/kg and is well tolerated by chickens, and treated birds showed no clinical complications at various doses tested. Oxfendazole and niclosamide are equally effective and safe. The most effective control measure is disruption of the habitat of intermediate hosts near poultry farms.
