= Raillietina cesticillus =

Scientific classification
- Kingdom: Animalia
- Phylum: Platyhelminthes
- Class: Cestoda
- Order: Cyclophyllidea
- Family: Davaineidae
- Genus: Raillietina
- Species: R. cesticillus

Binomial name
- Raillietina cesticillus Molin, 1858

Species of flatworm

Raillietina cesticillus is a parasitic tapeworm of the family Davaineidae. Sometimes called the broad-headed tapeworm, it infects the small intestine of chicken and occasionally other birds, such as guinea fowl and turkey, which are generally in close proximity to backyard poultry. It is a relatively harmless species among intestinal cestodes in spite of a high prevalence. In fact it probably is the most common parasitic platyhelminth in modern poultry facilities throughout the world.

It is readily distinguished from the other species of Raillietina. The body size is small, scolex is disproportionately large and uniquely shaped, rostellum is wide, and it employs beetles as intermediate host to complete its life cycle.

== Description ==
Raillietina cesticillus is a small tapeworm measuring about 15 centimetres (5.9 in) in length, and 1.5–3 millimetres (0.059–0.118 in) in width. It is whitish in colour, highly elongated, dorso-ventrally flattened, and entirely covered with a tegument. The body consists of the head region called 'scolex', an unsegmented 'neck', and a highly segmented body proper called strobila. The strobila is composed of a chain of ribbon-like proglottids. The scolex bears an apical rounded rostellum surrounded by four suckers. Unlike other species of Raillietina, it is exceptionally broad-headed, the rostellum is very prominent and protruding, and the suckers are small. In addition the rostellar hooks are arranged in two rows. A significant diagnostic character is an unusually numerous hooks, which may be as many as 500. The suckers are poorly developed, and completely devoid of special devices or spines. The scolex measures ~134 μm in diameter, and the hooks are 7-10 μm in length.

== Life cycle ==
The tapeworm completes its life cycle in two different hosts, the definitive host being mostly of chickens, and the intermediate hosts are beetles. More than 100 species of beetles are known to act as intermediate host. Other avian species such as guinea fowl and turkey are also often infected when they ingest infected beetles. A complete life cycle requires 2–4 weeks. One defining feature of the species during developmental stage is the occurrence of a single egg in each egg capsule. The development of an egg embryo to a mature cysticercoid in its intermediate host requires 28 days after infection, but fully mature cysticercoid takes about 31–34 days. Adults were found from chicken after 15 days of infection with mature cysticercoid, and the gravid segments can be obtained in the faeces from 27 to 112 days. Species of flour beetle Tribolium are particularly important as intermediate host since they are the most common pest of chicken feed.

== Pathogenicity and pathology ==
The adult parasite inhabits the small intestine. Generally infection is asymptomatic, and there are no reports of clinical disease. It is considered as the least pathogenic species of Raillietina. However, under heavy loads of experimental infections, pathological symptoms include degeneration of epithelial cells, enteritis, and macrophage infiltration of lymphocyte.

== Diagnosis and treatment ==
Infection is diagnosed by identifying proglottids in the faeces, or adult worms in the intestine upon autopsy. Fenbendazole is 100.0% efficacious when administered in the diet at 240 ppm (50.9 mg/kg BW) for 6 days in naturally infected broilers; but less effective at lower doses, without affecting the appetite nor it induced any adverse effects on weight gain. Albendazole is a better drug of choice in terms of efficacy and sideeffects.
