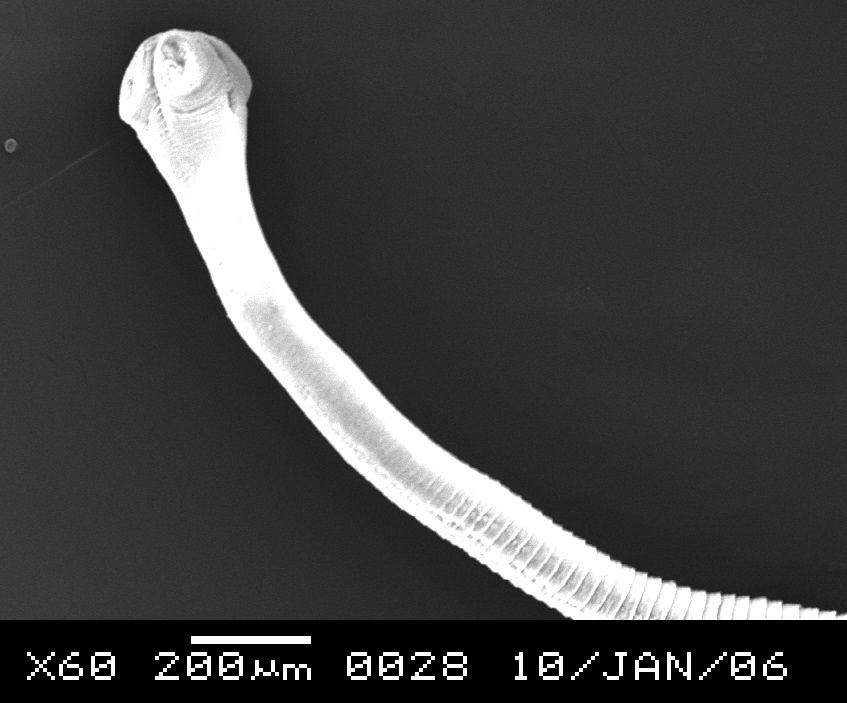
- Raillietina tetragona

Scientific classification
- Kingdom: Animalia
- Phylum: Platyhelminthes
- Class: Cestoda
- Order: Cyclophyllidea
- Family: Davaineidae
- Genus: Raillietina; Fuhrmann, 1920

Species
- Raillietina australis; Raillietina beveridgei; Raillietina celebensis; Raillietina cesticillus; Raillietina chiltoni; Raillietina coreensis; Raillietina dromaius; Raillietina echinobothrida; Raillietina micracantha; Raillietina mitchelli; Raillietina sonini; Raillietina tetragona; Raillietina tunetensis

Diversity
- 37 species

= Raillietina =

Genus of flatworms

Raillietina is a genus of tapeworms that includes helminth parasites of vertebrates, mostly of birds. The genus was named in 1920 in honour of a French veterinarian and helminthologist, Louis-Joseph Alcide Railliet. Of the 37 species recorded under the genus, Raillietina demerariensis, R. asiatica, and R. formsana are the only species reported from humans, while the rest are found in birds. R. echinobothrida, R. tetragona, and R. cesticillus are the most important species in terms of prevalence and pathogenicity among wild and domestic birds.

== Species ==
Some important species include:

- Raillietina allomyodes
- Raillietina anatina
- Raillietina apivori
- Raillietina australis
- Raillietina baeri
- Raillietina beveridgei
- Raillietina carneostrobilata
- Raillietina celebensis
- Raillietina cesticillus
- Raillietina chiltoni
- Raillietina clerci
- Raillietina coturnixi
- Raillietina crassula
- Raillietina cyrtus
- Raillietina demerariensis
- Raillietina dromaius
- Raillietina echinobothrida
- Raillietina friedbergeri
- Raillietina graeca
- Raillietina grobbeni
- Raillietina joyeuxi
- Raillietina loeweni
- Raillietina michaelseni
- Raillietina micracantha
- Raillietina mitchelli
- Raillietina melomyos
- Raillietina moldavica
- Raillietina multicapsulata
- Raillietina olicapsulata
- Raillietina pici
- Raillietina pintneri
- Raillietina sonini
- Raillietina tetragona
- Raillietina volzi
- Raillietina weissi

== Description ==
The body of an adult Raillietina is a typical tapeworm structure, composed of a series of ribbon-like body segments, gradually enlarging from the anterior end towards the posterior. It is whitish in colour, highly elongated, dorso-ventrally flat, and entirely covered with a tegument. The entire body is divisible into 3 parts, namely the head region called scolex, followed by an unsegmented neck or growth region, and then by highly segmented body proper called strobila. The scolex is a bulbous knob-like structure bearing suckers and a rostellum, which are the organs of attachment to the host. A defining structure from those of other tapeworms is a single prominent rostellum surrounded by four suckers. Further, an important diagnostic character among the different species of the genus is the number and arrangement of hooks and spines on the scolex. The suckers are poorly developed, and completely devoid of special devices or spines. The scolex measures ~134 μ in diameter, and the hooks are 7-10 μ in length. Individual segments in the strobila are called 'proglottids' and are entirely covered with hair-like microtriches. These microtriches are the absorptive structures for feeding, and there are no digestive organs. As all other cestodes, they are hermaphrodite. A set of both male and female reproductive systems is present in each proglottid.

== Life cycle ==
Raillietina require two different hosts for a complete life cycle. The definitive hosts are mostly wild and domestic birds, and sometimes humans. The intermediate hosts are insects, such as ants and beetles. Mature eggs are released from the avian host through feaces by detaching the last gravid proglottid. The number of egg cell in each egg capsule is an identifying feature of each species. Eggs develop into larval forms called oncospheres, which are ingested by ants, and enters the alimentary canal, from where they migrates into the abdominal cavity of the insect and develops into mature cysticercoids. A cysticercoid is an inflated sphere with distinct rostellar hooks, and each species has characteristic number and size of the hooks, which correspond to those of adult worms. Development of the juvenile stage in the intermediate host comprises 5 stages, namely (1) oncosphere stage, (2) lacuna stage, (3) cystic cavity stage, (4) scolex formation stage and (5) cysticercoid stage, which is the ultimate infective form. When the insect with infective larvae is ingested by birds, the cysticercoid is released in host by the action of digestive juices. The rostellar hooks then become attached to the intestinal wall. New segments begin to form and within 3 weeks of ingestion of the host, a mature tapeworm develops. Therefore, the entire life-cycle can take 6 weeks for completion.

== Pathogenicity and pathology ==
They are intestinal parasites in the definitive host. The level of their infection and clinical pathogenicity is characteristic of each species. R. cesticillus is quite harmless in terms of symptoms; whereas R. echinobothrida is highly pathogenic, and causes nodular tapeworm disease under heavy infection. Under severe infection, stunted growth and decreased egg production, resulting in loss of meat and egg productions are experienced. Chronic infection results in diarrhoea, emaciation and anaemia, indicated by haemorrhage in the intestine. Physiological symptoms include degeneration of epithelial cells, enteritis, and macrophage infiltration of lymphocyte.

== Diagnosis and treatment ==
Infection is directly diagnosed by identifying proglottids in the faeces, or adult worms in the intestine upon autopsy. Broad-spectrum anthelmintics such as albendazole, fenbendazole, praziquantel, oxfendazole and niclosamide are all effective against the different species. The most effective control measure is disruption of the habitat of intermediate hosts near poultry farms.
