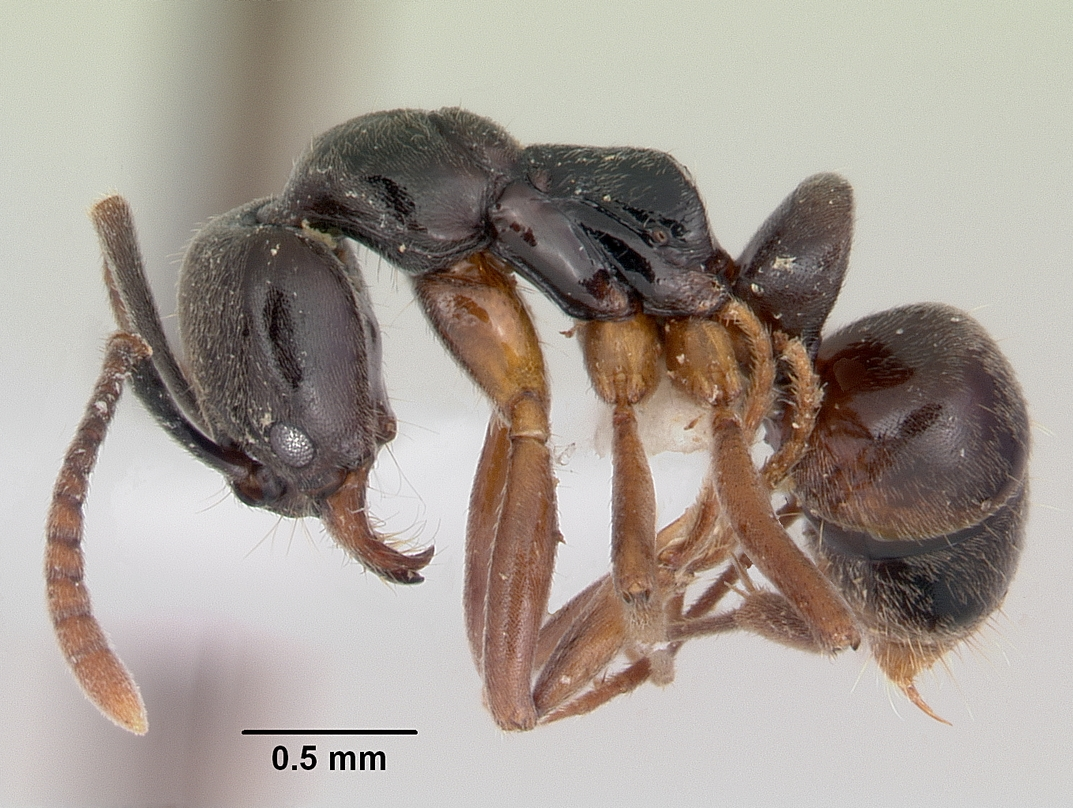
- Brachyponera chinensis worker from the United States

Scientific classification
- Kingdom: Animalia
- Phylum: Arthropoda
- Clade: Pancrustacea
- Class: Insecta
- Order: Hymenoptera
- Family: Formicidae
- Genus: Brachyponera
- Species: B. chinensis

Binomial name
- Brachyponera chinensis (Emery, 1895)

= Brachyponera chinensis =

Species of ant

Brachyponera chinensis, the Asian needle ant, is a stinging ponerine ant native to areas of Japan and mainland Asia. It was known as Pachycondyla chinensis, a name used in many scientific publications until 2014. The Asian needle ant was introduced to the United States in the 1930s, where it is considered an adventive and possibly invasive species. Since then, the Asian needle ant and the Argentine ant (Linepithema humile) have been competing for territory in the U.S. Brachyponera chinensis is found primarily in the American South, where the ants prefer to nest beneath or near hardwood trees. They are also found along the U.S. East Coast, from Florida to Massachusetts. The range of Asian needle ant then extends westward to Kentucky, Tennessee, and Arkansas. Sightings have also been confirmed in Washington and Wisconsin, where outlier populations have been established. This invasive species is of growing concern due to ecological impacts on biodiversity and medical risks to human health, via sting-induced anaphylaxis.

== Habitat and biology ==
The native range of Brachyponera chinensis includes Japan, China, North and South Korea, Taiwan, Thailand, Vietnam, and Nepal.

The Asian needle ant thrives in moist and shaded environments. Brachyponera chinensis is commonly found in agricultural land such as rice-paddy dykes in its native range. The Asian needle ant frequently makes ground nests in natural forests, preferably beneath stones, logs, or debris. Brachyponera chinensis tend to occupy nests near termite colonies, as termites are a reliable food source. Additionally, this species has also been found to inhabit urban areas in places such as backyards or sidewalks.

== Behavior and social structure ==
Brachyponera chinensis exhibits eusociality, with overlapping generations and division of labor within the colony. The queen ant's primary role is for reproduction, while the worker ants help to forage to preserve the colony. Worker ants lack reproductive organs and cannot reproduce. Queen ants have a special pouch to store male sperm that allows them to mate once and continually reproduce over their lifespan.

During emigration of nesting sites, Brachyponera chinensis split into groups to tend to the categories of scouting for new nest locations, queen-tending, and tending to the colony's offspring. A recruitment strategy called adult transport is where workers carry nestmates during nest emigration. Unlike many other ant species, the Asian needle ant do not rely on pheromone trails for tandem carrying but instead they likely use visual cues.

== Invasive potential ==
Brachyponera chinensis has been introduced to many parts of the world, and is considered an invasive species due to its adaptability and competitive advantages over native ant species. A pre-adaptive trait this species possesses is the ability to tolerate in-breeding and mitigate the negative effects associated with genetic bottlenecks by maintaining heterozygosity levels in colonies. The Asian needle ant was likely introduced via shipping docks perhaps over multiple occasions, which could have allowed for hybridization.

In Germany, the species was discovered in 2025 in the zoo Wilhelma in Stuttgart.

A study in North Carolina found that Brachyponera chinensis outnumbered all native ant species in most sample areas. The presence of Brachyponera chinensis was also correlated with a reduction in biodiversity. Additional research on the ecological impact found the native ant species Aphaenogaster rudis was reduced by 96% in invaded areas containing the Asian needle ant. These disturbances of native communities have cascading effects on a broader range of ecosystem processes.

Owing to the significant negative impacts of the ant since its introduction into the European ecosystem, the European Union has included it in the list of invasive alien species of Union concern. Hence, it cannot be imported, bred, transported, commercialized, or intentionally released into the environment in any EU member states.

== Public health impact ==
Studies have found that Brachyponera chinensis negatively impacts public health. Although not aggressive, the Asian needle ant will sting when disturbed; its sting can be painful and leave people in distress. Allergic reactions involved with the proteins in the ant's venom can cause anaphylaxis, and in some cases urticaria.

As Brachyponera chinensis continues to invade more urban environments, the incidence of human encounters is likely to rise over time. Brachyponera chinensis is commonly mistaken due to its similar morphology to other ants, such as Brachyponera luteipes, Brachyponera nigrita, and Brachyponera obscurans. Misidentification of the Asian needle ant can lead to lack of awareness of the consequences of its sting, which could potentially delay proper medical treatment.
