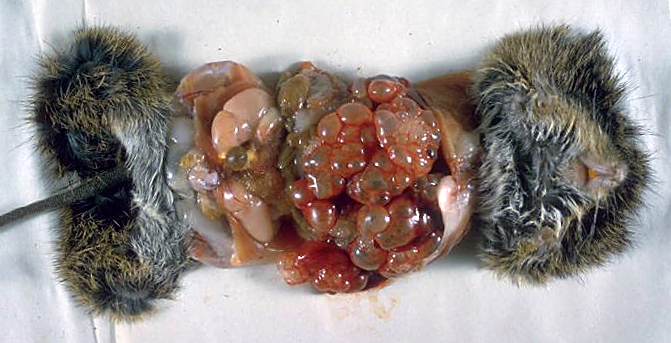
- Necropsy of a cotton rat infected with Echinococcus multilocularis

Scientific classification
- Kingdom: Animalia
- Phylum: Platyhelminthes
- Class: Cestoda
- Order: Cyclophyllidea
- Family: Taeniidae
- Genus: Echinococcus; Rudolphi, 1801

= Echinococcus =

Genus of worms

schematic representation of the life cycle of Echinococcus

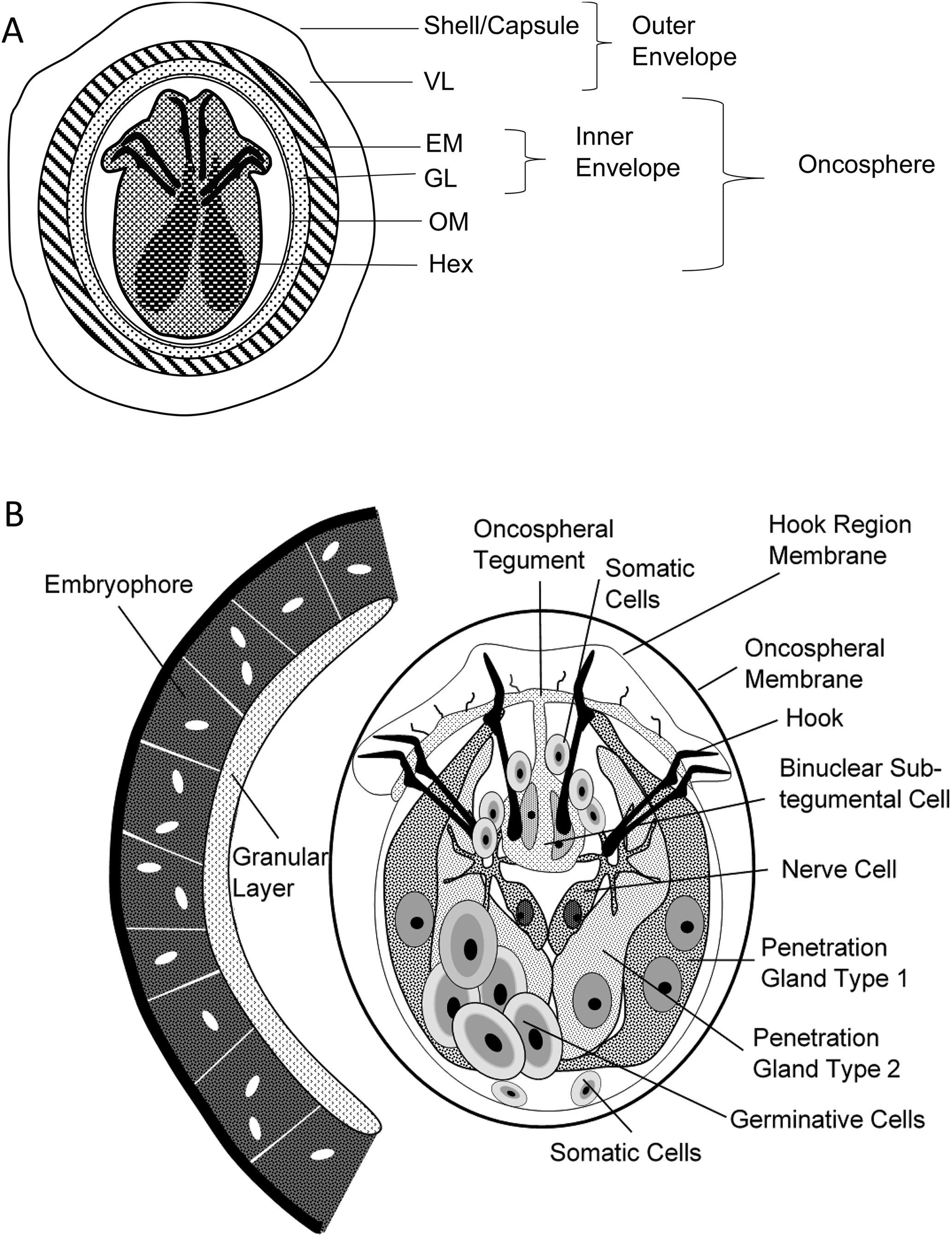
General description of the egg and oncosphere of Echinococcus spp.

Echinococcus is a genus within Cestoda, a parasitic class of the platyhelminthes phylum (colloquially known as flatworms). Human echinococcosis is an infectious disease caused by the following species: E. granulosus, E. multilocularis, E. vogeli or E. oligarthrus.

Echinococcus is triploblastic – it has three layers – outermost ectoderm, middle mesoderm, and inner endoderm. An anus is absent, and it has no digestive system. Its body is covered by tegument and the worm is divided into a scolex, a short neck, and three to six proglottids. Its body shape is ribbon-like.

In humans, Echinococcus spp. cause a disease called echinococcosis. The three types of echinococcosis are cystic echinococcosis caused by E. granulosus, alveolar echinococcosis caused by E. multilocularis, and polycystic echinococcosis caused by E. vogeli or E. oligarthrus. A worm's incubation period is usually long and can be up to 50 years. Cystic echinococcosis is mostly found in South and Central America, Africa, the Middle East, China, Italy, Spain, Greece, Russia, and the western United States (Arizona, New Mexico, and California).

Echinococcosis is a zoonosis. The definitive hosts are carnivorous predators – dogs, wolves, foxes, and lions. The adult tapeworm lives in their small intestines and delivers eggs to be excreted with the stool. The intermediate hosts are infected by ingesting eggs. Sheep, goats, cattle, camels, pigs, wild herbivores, and rodents are the usual intermediate hosts, but humans can also be infected. Humans are dead-end hosts, since their corpses are nowadays seldom eaten by carnivorous predators.

The egg hatches in the digestive system of the intermediate host, producing a planula larva. It penetrates the intestinal wall and is carried by bloodstream to liver, lung, brain, or another organ. It settles there and turns into a bladder-like structure called hydatid cyst. From the inner lining of its wall, protoscoleces (i.e. scoleces with invaginated tissue layers) bud and protrude into the fluid filling the cyst.

After the death of the normal intermediate host, its body can be eaten by carnivores suitable as definitive hosts. In their small intestines, protoscoleces turn inside out, attach, and give rise to adult tapeworms, completing the lifecycle. In humans, the cysts persist and grow for years. They are regularly found in the liver (and every possible organ: spleen, kidney, bone, brain, tongue, breast and skin) and are asymptomatic until their growing size produces symptoms or are accidentally discovered. Disruption of the cysts (spontaneous or iatrogenic e.g. liver biopsy) can be life-threatening due to anaphylactic shock.

Rarely, cystic echinococcosis may involve the breast. A 2024 case report described hydatid disease of the male breast in a 46-year-old man, in whom the diagnosis was suspected on ultrasonography and subsequently confirmed by fine-needle aspiration cytology and histopathology. Ultrasonography demonstrated detached internal membranes resembling the “water-lily sign” classically described in hydatid disease.

Cysts are detected with ultrasound, X-ray computed tomography, or other imaging techniques. Antiechinococcus antibodies can be detected with serodiagnostic tests – indirect fluorescent antibody, complement fixation, ELISA, Western blot, and other methods.

== Taxonomy ==
A phylogenetic tree has been created for several species in this genus – Echinococcus oligarthrus, Echinococcus vogeli, Echinococcus multilocularis, Echinococcus shiquicus, Echinococcus equinus, Echinococcus ortleppi, and Echinococcus granulosus. The first diverging species are the neotropical endemic species E. oligarthrus and E. vogeli. E. ortleppi and E. canadensis are sister species, as are E. multilocularis and E. shiquicus. E. canadensis is related to E. granulosus.

The origin of these parasites based on host-parasite co-evolution comparisons was North America or Asia, depending on whether the ancestral definitive hosts were canids or felids.

Echinococcus oligarthrus and Echinococcus vogeli are basal in this genus. The genus is a sister to the genus Taenia from which it diverged more than 10 million years ago. The genus Echinococcus evolved in North America in canids and began to diversify 5.8 million years ago.

In 2020, an international effort of scientists from 16 countries lead to a detailed consensus on terminology, i.e. the terms to be used or rejected for the genetics, epidemiology, biology, immunology and clinical aspects linked with Echinococcus species.
