= Chapmania =

Chapmania may refer to:

- Chapmania (flatworm), a genus of flatworms in the family Davaineidae
- Chapmania, a genus of foraminifers in the family Chapmaninidae, synonym of Chapmanina
- Chapmania, a genus of beetles in the family Staphylinidae, synonym of Charhyphus
- Chapmania (trilobite), synonym of Chapmanopyge
