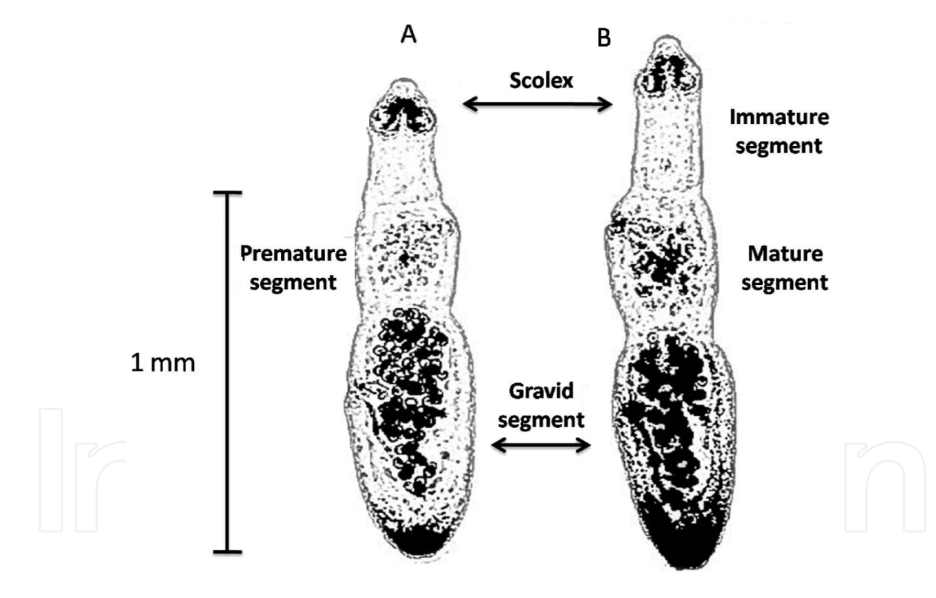

Scientific classification
- Kingdom: Animalia
- Phylum: Platyhelminthes
- Class: Cestoda
- Order: Cyclophyllidea
- Family: Taeniidae
- Genus: Echinococcus
- Species: E. shiquicus

Binomial name
- Echinococcus shiquicus Xiao et al., 2005

= Echinococcus shiquicus =

Species of flatworm

Echinococcus shiquicus is a parasitic worm first identified in 2005. It was found in Tibetan foxes in the Qinghai–Tibet plateau region. Two types of adult worms were recovered and the variant which had a short strobila consisting of single immature and single gravid segments constituted the majority of the specimens. The strobila, rostellar hooks, location of the genital pore and the number of eggs in gravid uterus helped in differentiating Echinococcus shiquicus from the other species. The metacestode of E. shiquicus was detected exclusively from plateau pikas. The larvae are unique and they develop into unilocular mini cysts approximately 1 cm in diameter within the liver or lungs.
