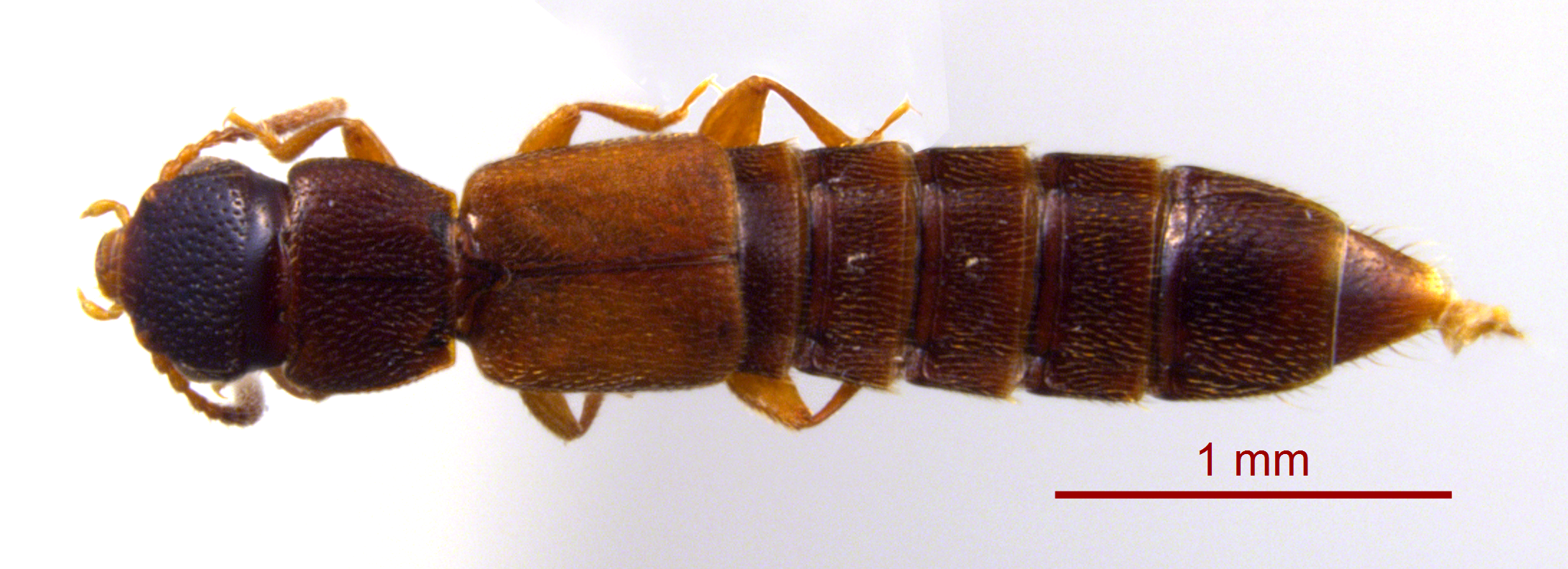
- Charhyphus picipennis

Scientific classification
- Kingdom: Animalia
- Phylum: Arthropoda
- Clade: Pancrustacea
- Class: Insecta
- Order: Coleoptera
- Suborder: Polyphaga
- Infraorder: Staphyliniformia
- Family: Staphylinidae
- Subfamily: Phloeocharinae; Erichson, 1839

= Phloeocharinae =

Subfamily of beetles

Phloeocharinae is a subfamily of beetles in the family Staphylinidae. It was first described by Erichson in 1839.

== Anatomy ==
- Procoxae without mesal grove.
- Abdominal tergites IV and V each with a pair of distinctive cuticular combs.
- Hypopharynx distinctive.
- Tarsi 5-5-5
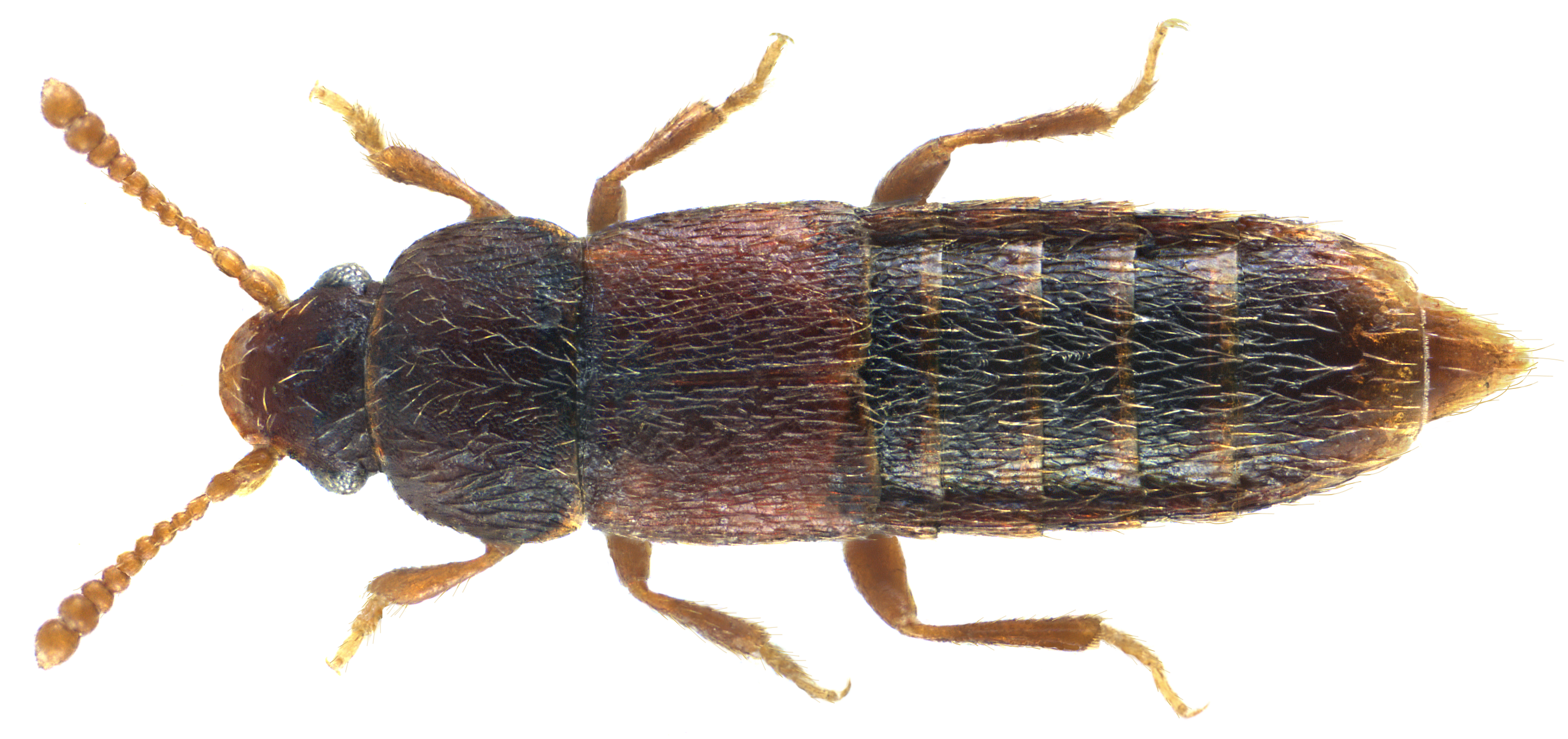
Phloeocharis subtilissima

== Ecology ==
- Habitat: generally found in damp places, leaf litter, under bark.
- Collection method: sift/Berlese forest litter, barking, luck.
- Biology: poorly known.

== Systematics ==
Five genera and six species in North America. In Europe only the genus Phloeocharis, with 12 species mostly in the Mediterranean, only P. subtilissima widespread throughout Europe.

=== Genera ===
- Charhyphus
- Dytoscotes
- Ecbletus
- Phloeocharis
- Phloeognathus
- Pseudophloeocharis
- Vicelva
