= Invasive species in the United Arab Emirates =

Invasive species are a significant threat to native species of the United Arab Emirates, bringing about environmental and agricultural damage. Although the country is considered to be extremely arid and hard for foreign species to settle in, as of 2019, 242 invasive species had been found within the country. Invasive species typically endanger endemic species through predation and competition. Of the major taxonomic groups, birds have the most invasive species, with 49%.

== History ==
The United Arab Emirates defines an invasive species as a non-native species of living organism whose introduction threatens local biodiversity. The invasion of foreign species is considered a threat to native ecosystems within the country. Although deserts are one of the least-invaded ecosystems in the world, the United Arab Emirates has a significant amount of invasive species in the country. As of 2019, there were 272 invasive species in the country. Invasive species within the United Arab Emirates are noted as having detrimental effects on endemic species by diminishing biodiversity. For instance, a study for the Plant Ecology journal found that sites containing the invasive species Neltuma juliflora had lower biodiversity and indigenous species were displaced. The plant was originally introduced in Abu Dhabi in the 1970s to combat desertification, and seeds were eventually spread through livestock and reached other Emirates.

The United Arab Emirates is noted for its harsh, arid climate, which makes the establishment and survival of invasive species hard. A 2015 study by the Journal of Threatened Taxa found that of a total of 146 invasive species, the highest percentage in the major taxonomic groups were birds (49%), followed by invertebrates (34%), plants, reptiles and amphibians (5% each), mammals (4%), and freshwater fish (3%).

== Notable invasive species ==
=== Birds ===
Of the then 146 invasive species in 2015, 49% were birds. The main vectors of entry were recorded as accidental introduction (41%) and escape from captivity (34%). The most common invasive bird species are Acridotheres tristis and Corvus splendens.

Picture	Common name	Species Name	Introduction	Control Measures	Notes	Ref.
A house crow seen from the side, standing on grass. It is mainly a rich, glossy black colour, with a lighter grey-brown colour in its neck and breast.	House crow	Corvus splendens	Introduced through boarding ships and dhows. Spreads along coastal cities with human inhabitants.	Physical capture and removal.	The species is native to the Indian subcontinent. They predate on native biodiversity and compete with native species for resources.	
A green rose-ringed parakeet with a red beak on a branch.	Rose-ringed parakeet	Psittacula krameri	Introduced as escaped or released pets.	Physical capture and removal.	The species is native to the Indian subcontinent. They cause significant damage to date palm plantations.	
A common myna on a branch. Its bill and legs are bright yellow, with a brown body and a black head.	Common myna	Acridotheres tristis	Introduced as escaped or released pets.	Physical capture and removal.	The species is native to Asia, particularly south, southeast, and east Asia. They compete with native species for resources.	
Three Egyptian geese standing in shallow water.	Egyptian goose	Alopochen aegyptiacus	Introduced as escaped or released pets.	Physical capture and removal.	The species is native to Africa and is found in wetlands within the United Arab Emirates. They compete with native birds for resources.	
Four African sacred ibis' standing and walking.	African sacred ibis	Threskiornis ethiopicus	Introduced through intentional releases and escapes from zoos.	No strategies in place for control.	The species is found in Sub-Saharan Africa, particularly in Egypt. In the United Arab Emirates, these birds compete with native species for resources and nesting sites.	
A white-eared bulbul on a branch. It has a grey body and plummage, and a black head.	White-eared bulbul	Pycnonotus leucotis	Introduced as birds released or escaped from pet trade.	Trapping.	The bird is native to Asia. They compete with native birds for resources.	

=== Fish ===
From the 146 recorded invasive species in 2015, only 3% were recorded as fish invasive. All freshwater invasive species have been recorded as accidental introductions. They are limited to wadis and dams that collect water.

Picture	Common name	Species Name	Introduced	Control Measures	Notes	Ref.
A common carp being held by a person. It has been freshly caught and is still alive. It is grey and yellow in colour.	Common carp	Cyprinus carpio	Likely introduced accidentally or intentionally.	Physical removal.	Originally native to Europe, the common carp has become an established invasive species worldwide. In the United Arab Emirates, common carps that become established in wadis can be harmful to the native species as they compete for resources and spread diseases.	
A dead Tilapia in a person's hand. It is black and white in colour.	Tilapia	Oreochromis spp.	Likely introduced accidentally or intentionally.	Physical removal.	Tilapia are originally from Sub-Saharan Africa and have been recorded in the Zakher Pools of Al Ain. They compete with native species for resources.	

=== Invertebrates ===
In 2015, 34% of invasive species were invertebrates. 32% of those invasive species were recorded as "accidental introductions", while 68% had unknown vectors. The majority of invasive vertebrates have become naturalized in their environments. For instance, fire ant Solenopsis geminata, endemic to Central America, has an adverse impact on local ecology through predation and competition.

Picture	Common name	Species Name	Introduced	Control Measures	Notes	Ref.
A red palm weevil in the wild.	Red palm weevil	Rhynchophorus ferrugineus	Introduced through the importation of infected date palm trees.	Strict quarantine measures at ports of entry, pheromone traps.	Red palm weevils are considered extremely damaging to date palm trees, with their larvae digging holes into the trunk, eventually weakening and killing the tree. This affects the production of dates and has a negative impact on the economy of the United Arab Emirates. Excessive uses of insecticides to kill the weevils have also resulted in the loss of beneficial native insects.	
A tropical leatherleaf slug on a pavement. It is brown in colour.	Tropical Leatherleaf slug	Laevicaulis alte	Introduced through landscaping and agricultural activities.	Chemical control through the use of insecticides.	This species is native to east and west Africa. They feed on agricultural and native plants and transmit diseases to plants and livestock through faeces.	
A surinam cockroach on a leaf. It is brown and black in colour.	Surinam cockroach	Pycnoscelus surinamensis	Introduced through the import of goods.	Chemical control through the use of insecticides and pheromone traps.	The surinam cockroach is native to the Indo-Malayan region. They infest agricultural produce and are destructive towards plants.	
A samsum ant in the wild. It has a black body and brown legs.	Samsum ant	Brachyponera sennaarensis (formerly known as Pachycondyla sennaarensis)	Introduced through the importation of goods.	Insecticides.	Samsum ants have been recorded in urban regions in the United Arab Emirates. They pose a threat to endemic Arabian ant species.	
A diagram of a southern flat coin snail.	Southern flat coin snail	Polygyra cereolus	Introduced through imported grass. Spread through landscaping and agricultural activities.	Chemical control.	This species has been introduced in Abu Dhabi and Dubai. It is an agricultural pest, and feeds on alfalfa and clover.	
A redback spider in its web on a leaf. It has a short, wide abdomen with a red mark on it. The rest of the spider is black.	Redback spider	Latrodecutus hasselti	Introduced through importation.	Chemical control and destruction of egg sacs and webs.	It is commonly found outdoors in urban areas. They are responsible for the majority of serious spider bites in the United Arab Emirates.	
A brown widow spider on a web.	Brown widow spider	Latrodecutus geometricus	Introduced through agricultural imports.	Chemical control.	The venom of the brown widow spider is neurotoxic.	

=== Mammals ===
Mammals constituted 4% of all invasive species in 2015. The main pathways for the introduction of invasive mammals are through accidental introduction (50%) and escape from captivity (50%). The most common mammalian invasive species are Felis domesticus, Canis familiaris, Rattus rattus, Rattus norvegicus and Mus musculus. All of the above species are disease vectors and considered extremely dangerous to native mammalian species.

Picture	Common name	Species Name	Introduced	Control Measures	Notes	Ref.
A feral cat looks into the camera. It is grey in colour and has a clipped ear, indicating it is neutered or spayed.	Feral cat	Felis catus	Introduced as escaped or released pets.	Physical capture, trap–neuter–return programs.	Feral cats have been thought to have contributed towards the decrease in native species of reptiles, birds, and small mammals. They are widespread in urban areas and commonly feed on ground nesting birds. They also transmit diseases and threaten native wildcat species through hybridization. For instance, the Felis silvestris gordoni is threatened by genetic dilution due to interbreeding with feral cats.	
Two stray dogs look into the camera. One is in focus and standing, while the other in the background is sitting. They are white, brown, and black in colour.	Feral dog	Canis lupus familiaris	Introduced as escaped or released pets.	Physical removal.	Feral dogs chase and harm endemic species, which has resulted in changes in behaviour of native wildlife. They can also spread diseases such as rabies to animals and humans.	
A black rat on a sack filled with food grains.	Black rat	Rattus rattus	Introduced through cargo transport.	Physical removal and thorough inspections of cargo.	Black rats originated from South Asia and are now distributed globally. They are considered pests by farmers as they consume a wide range of agricultural products and food. They threaten native species, such as by eating the eggs of seabirds.	
An Indian palm squirrel on a rock sticking its tongue out.	Indian palm squirrel	Funambulus palmarum	Introduced through pet trade.	Trapping and legislation on the sale of squirrels as pets.	The Indian palm squirrel is native to India and Sri Lanka. They have been found in Abu Dhabi and are damaging to flowering plants in the country.	
A rock hyrax on a rock, looking at the camera.	Rock hyrax	Procavia capensis	Introduced through intentional releases or escapees from zoos.	Physical removal.	Rock hyrax's have been found in Jebel Hafeet and Sir Bani Yas. They have a negative impact on native species of mammals and vegetation.	
A white goat with horns looks at the camera.	Feral goat	Capra aegagrus hircus	Introduced after escaping from farms.	Identifying habitats in rocky regions using trail cameras and physical removal.	Goats have negative effects on native vegetation through overgrazing and soil erosion. They have been found in Jebel Hafeet, and compete with native species such as the Arabian tahr.	
A brown rat eating.	Brown rat	Rattus norvegicus	Introduced through cargo transport.	Inspection of cargo, physical removal.	The brown rat is present in some islands of Abu Dhabi, and act as a threat to seabird species. They are also a pest of stored food.	
A house mouse sniffing the ground.	House mouse	Mus musculus	Introduced through cargo transport.	Physical removal and rodenticide.	The house mouse is typically found in buildings with food storage in the United Arab Emirates, and has also been recorded in some islands of Abu Dhabi. They pose as threats to native bird, reptile, and invertebrate species.	

=== Plants ===
Plants were 5% of all invasive species in the country as of 2015. Of the invasive species of plants in the country, 50% had an undetermined pathway into the country, and 25% each were determined to be accidental introductions and escapes from cultivation.

Picture	Common name	Species Name	Introduced	Control Measures	Notes	Ref.
Mesquite trees in Tamil Nadu, India. They have green leaves.	Mesquite Tree	Neltuma juliflora (formerly known as Prosopis juliflora)	Through importation.	Cutting and physical removal.	The species is native to Central America and has been introduced to several wadi environments in the United Arab Emirates, competing with native species. The plant is particularly damaging to endemic species such as Prosopis cineraria.	
Spiny sandbur plants in Kure Atoll.	Spiny sandbur	Cenchrus echinatus	Through the import of soil and non-native plant species.	Chemical control.	Native to the Americas, this plant grows amongst date palm plantations and compete with native species.	
A group of green plants with round leaves, sprouting pink flowers.	Shoreline Sea Purslane	Sesuvium portulacastrum	Introduced as an ornamental plant.	Local extinction.	Native to Florida, the United States. Sea Purslanes compete with native species.	
A flower amongst the leaves of a railroad vine plant.	Railroad vine	Ipomoea pes-caprae	Introduced as an ornamental plant.	Not considered highly problematic for removal.	The railroad vine is located in Abu Dhabi in saline soil. Once established, it is difficult to remove due to high tolerance of drought-like conditions.	
Prickly pear plants in Turkey. The leaves of mature plants are green, while sprouting ones are yellow-orange.	Prickly pear	Opuntia ficus-indica	Introduced as an ornamental plant.	Physical removal.	Originating from Mexico, the prickly pear is used in the United Arab Emirates for landscaping. They compete with native plant species.	
Diamond flower plants, showing green leaves and white flowers.	Old world diamond flower	Oldenlandia corymbosa	Introduced accidentally along with potting mixture and imported alongside grass.	Physical removal.	This species has been recorded in Abu Dhabi and is regarded as a lawn weed.	
Green plants with purple flowers.	Madagascar periwinkle	Catharanthus roseus (formerly known as Vinca rosea)	Introduced as an ornamental plant.	Local extinction.	This plant originated in Madagascar. It has been recorded in Abu Dhabi on disturbed ground.	
A group of white, drooping flowers on a plant.	Soldier's orchid	Zeuxine strateumatica	Introduced accidentally, likely through the import of grass.	Local extinction.	The soldier's orchid originated from Asia. The plant was found flowering in Jebel Hafeet from February to April, and is also found in Al Ain.	

=== Reptiles ===
Of the 146 invasive species in 2015, 5% of them were reptiles. Many of those are the result of human abandoning of animals. In one instance, a Stigmochelys pardalis was found on the Bul Sayeef Island in Abu Dhabi during a routine biodiversity check, with researchers noting it was most likely an abandoned pet.

Picture	Common name	Species Name	Introduced	Control Measures	Notes	Ref.
A green iguana on a tree in Costa Rica.	Green iguana	Iguana iguana	Introduced through intentional release or escape from captivity.	Education campaigns.	Native to Central America, the Green iguana displace native reptile species, introduce diseases, and negatively impact agriculture in the United Arab Emirates.	
A ball python hides in the branch of a tree. It had dark and light brown patterning.	Ball python	Python regius	Introduced through intentional release or escape from captivity.	Public awareness, licensing the species and monitoring sales.	Ball pythons predate on native rodent and bird species.	
A red-eared slider walking.	Red-eared slider	Trachemys scripta elegans	Introduced through intentional release or escape from captivity.	Regulating the trade of red-earned sliders and conducting regular inspections of freshwater habitats.	Red-eared sliders predate on native invertebrates, freshwater fish, and amphibians. They also transmit diseases to the native populations.	
