= Rhizoctonia mucoroides =

Scientific classification
- Kingdom: Fungi
- Division: Basidiomycota
- Class: Agaricomycetes
- Order: Cantharellales
- Family: Ceratobasidiaceae
- Genus: Rhizoctonia
- Species: R. mucoroides

Binomial name
- Rhizoctonia mucoroides G.E. Bernard

Species of fungus

Rhizoctonia mucoroides is a species of fungus in the family Ceratobasidiaceae. It is the endomycorrhizal partner of the orchid Zeuxine strateumatica.
