= Zeuxine vietnamica =

Scientific classification
- Kingdom: Plantae
- Clade: Tracheophytes
- Clade: Angiosperms
- Clade: Monocots
- Order: Asparagales
- Family: Orchidaceae
- Subfamily: Orchidoideae
- Tribe: Cranichideae
- Genus: Zeuxine
- Species: Z. vietnamica

Binomial name
- Zeuxine vietnamica Aver.

Synonyms
- Zeuxinella vietnamica (Aver.) Aver.

Species of orchid

Zeuxine vietnamica is a species of terrestrial orchids spreading by means of underground rhizomes. It is endemic to Vietnam.
