= Zeuxine exilis =

Ridley's jewel orchid

Scientific classification
- Kingdom: Plantae
- Clade: Tracheophytes
- Clade: Angiosperms
- Clade: Monocots
- Order: Asparagales
- Family: Orchidaceae
- Subfamily: Orchidoideae
- Tribe: Cranichideae
- Subtribe: Goodyerinae
- Genus: Zeuxine
- Species: Z. exilis

Binomial name
- Zeuxine exilis Ridl.

Species of orchid

Zeuxine exilis, commonly known as Ridley's jewel orchid or the slender jewel orchid, is a species of orchid that is endemic to Christmas Island where it grows in rainforest. It has three or four egg-shaped leaves and up to thirty small, dull reddish flowers crowded along a thin, hairy flowering stem. It was first recorded in 1904 but was not seen again until 2009.

== Description ==
Zeuxine exilis is a terrestrial, tuberous, perennial herb with three or four light green, lance-shaped leaves, 30–70 mm (1–3 in) long and 25–30 mm (0.98–1.2 in) wide. Between ten and thirty resupinate, dull reddish flowers with white petals, about 3 mm (0.1 in) long and 2 mm (0.08 in) wide are crowded on a thin, hairy flowering stem 170–240 mm (7–9 in) tall. The outside surface of the flowers is hairy. The dorsal sepal is about 3 mm (0.1 in) long, 1.5 mm (0.06 in) wide and overlaps the petals forming a hood over the column. The lateral sepals and petals are about 3 mm (0.1 in) long and 1 mm (0.04 in) wide with the lateral sepals spreading apart from each other. The labellum is white with a yellow centre, about 3 mm (0.1 in) long, 2 mm (0.08 in) wide with two lobes on the end that have wavy edges. Flowering occurs from July to September.

== Taxonomy and naming ==
Zeuxine exilis was first formally described in 1906 by Dr Henry Ridley and the description was published in the Journal of the Straits Branch of the Royal Asiatic Society. The specific epithet (exilis) is a Latin word meaning "thin" or "slender".

== History of rediscovery ==
The rugged terrain on Christmas Island deterred early naturalists from surveying much of island. Charles William Andrews, a British palaeontologist spent ten months on the island in 1897 and 1898 and although he collected several orchids, did not find Z. exilis. In October 1904, Henry Ridley, the first director of the Singapore Botanic Gardens made his second, longer visit and crossed the island, including the upper plateau where he collected the orchid he later named Z. exilis, on the 18th of that month. He noted "centre of the island, among ferns not rare."

The species was then not officially recorded for over a century and in the third Christmas Island National Park Management Plan (2002) it was considered "possibly extinct". Other botanists, including Dulcie Alicia Powell and David J. Du Puy made collections on the island in the 1980s and 1990s without locating Z. exilis. Then in 2009 it was found and collected by visiting research scientist Peter Green and the discovery was confirmed by Mark Clements.

== Distribution and habitat ==
Ridley's jewel orchid is endemic to Christmas Island where it grows in litter on the floor of rainforest.
