= Chapmania tauricollis =

Scientific classification
- Kingdom: Animalia
- Phylum: Platyhelminthes
- Class: Cestoda
- Order: Cyclophyllidea
- Family: Davaineidae
- Genus: Chapmania; Monticelli, 1893
- Species: C. tauricollis

Binomial name
- Chapmania tauricollis (Chapman, 1876)

Synonyms
- Caprodavainea Clerc, 1906; Capsodavainea Fuhrmann, 1901; Chapamnia Fuhrmann, 1906

Species of flatworm

Chapmania is a monotypic genus of flatworms belonging to the family Davaineidae. The only species is Chapmania tauricollis.
