= Davainea =

Scientific classification
- Kingdom: Animalia
- Phylum: Platyhelminthes
- Class: Cestoda
- Order: Cyclophyllidea
- Family: Davaineidae
- Genus: Davainea; Blanchard, 1891

Genus of flatworms

Davainea is a genus of flatworms belonging to the family Davaineidae.

The genus has cosmopolitan distribution.

Species:

- Davainea andrei Fuhrmann, 1933
- Davainea proglottina (Davaine, 1860)
- Davainea tetraoensis Fuhrmann, 1919
