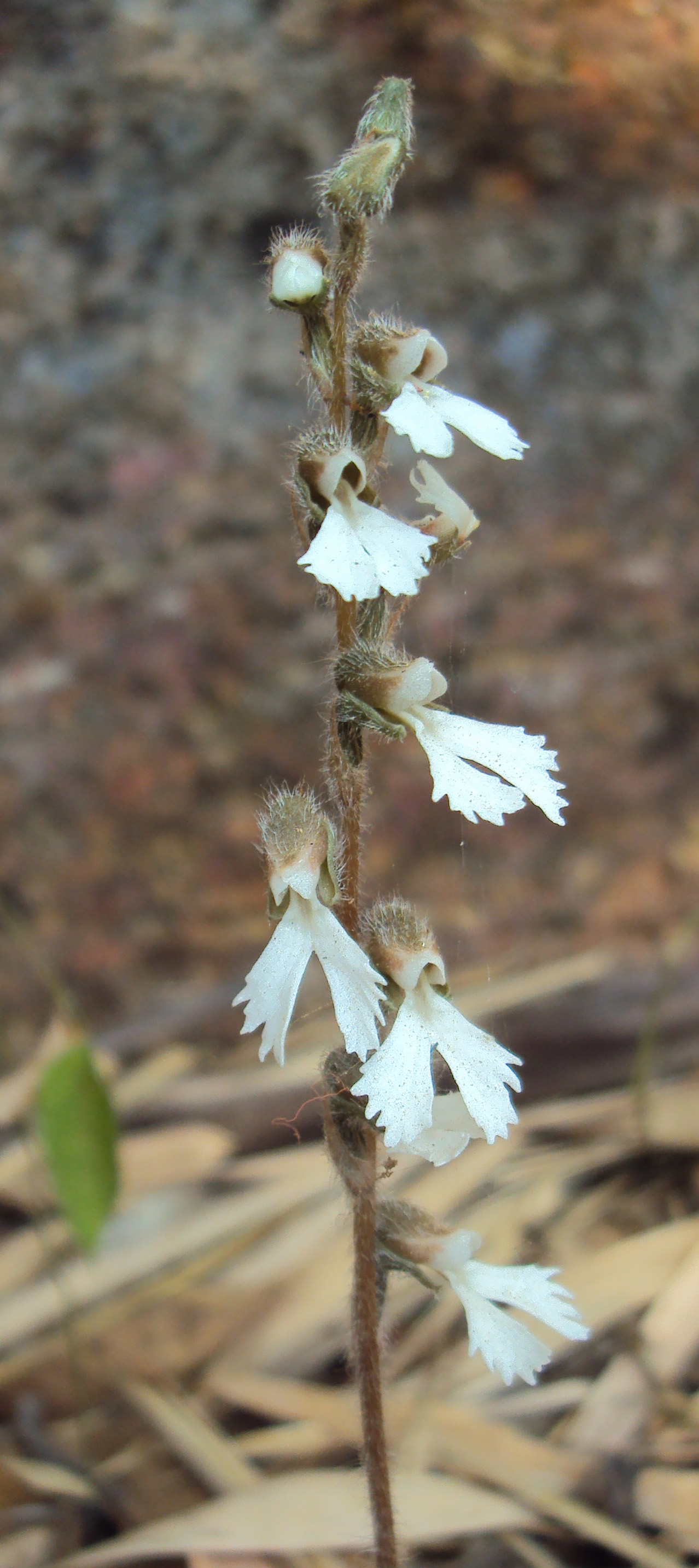

Scientific classification
- Kingdom: Plantae
- Clade: Tracheophytes
- Clade: Angiosperms
- Clade: Monocots
- Order: Asparagales
- Family: Orchidaceae
- Subfamily: Orchidoideae
- Tribe: Cranichideae
- Genus: Zeuxine
- Species: Z. longilabris

Binomial name
- Zeuxine longilabris (Lindl.) Trimen

= Zeuxine longilabris =

Long-lipped zeuxine

Species of orchid

Zeuxine longilabris is a terrestrial orchid species belonging to the family Orchidaceae. It is seen across Indo-Malesia. It is a slender, small sized plant with lower creeping stem and an erect part growing up to 25cm. Flowers are white with coarsely toothed petals. Flowering season is late fall to early winter.
