= Zeuxine rolfeana =

Conservation status
- Critically Endangered (IUCN 3.1)

Scientific classification
- Kingdom: Plantae
- Clade: Tracheophytes
- Clade: Angiosperms
- Clade: Monocots
- Order: Asparagales
- Family: Orchidaceae
- Subfamily: Orchidoideae
- Tribe: Cranichideae
- Subtribe: Goodyerinae
- Genus: Zeuxine
- Species: Z. rolfeana

Binomial name
- Zeuxine rolfeana King & Pantl.

Species of orchid

Zeuxine rolfeana is a deciduous terrestrial orchid belonging to the subfamily Orchidoideae. It is found in South Andaman Island. Its name is also spelt Zeuxine rolfiana.

== Description ==
The plant is 15 to 18 in (40 to 50 cm) tall, with three or four basal leaves, 1.75 to 3 in (45 to 75 mm) long and up to 1.2 in (30 mm) wide. The plant also has three or four well separated bracts. The inflorescence is a spike 2 to 3 in (5 to 8 cm) long with numerous flowers about 0.2 in (5 mm) across. The lateral petals are the same length as the sepals. The lip is longer than the sepals and lateral petals and ends in a pouch or sac. The column is short and broad with a pointed apex.

== Taxonomy ==
Zeuxine rolfeana was first described by George King and Robert Pantling in 1897. The publication uses the spelling rolfiana, although in the introduction to their paper they thank R. A. Rolfe, and under Art. 60.8(c) of the International Code of Nomenclature for algae, fungi, and plants, an epithet formed from his name would be expected to have the construction rolfe + ana, which is the spelling published earlier in the paper for the species Oberon rolfeana. As of December 2023, Plants of the World Online used the spelling rolfeana, whereas Tropicos used the spelling rolfiana.
