= Zeuxine oblonga =

Common jewel orchid

Scientific classification
- Kingdom: Plantae
- Clade: Tracheophytes
- Clade: Angiosperms
- Clade: Monocots
- Order: Asparagales
- Family: Orchidaceae
- Subfamily: Orchidoideae
- Tribe: Cranichideae
- Subtribe: Goodyerinae
- Genus: Zeuxine
- Species: Z. oblonga

Binomial name
- Zeuxine oblonga R.S.Rogers & C.T.White

Species of orchid

Zeuxine oblonga , commonly known as common jewel orchid is a species of orchid that is endemic to northern Australia. It has up to seven narrow egg-shaped leaves and up to thirty small green and white flowers crowded along a fleshy, hairy flowering stem. It mainly grows in wet forest and rainforest.

== Description ==
Zeuxine oblonga is a terrestrial, tuberous, perennial herb. It has between three and seven dark green, narrow egg-shaped leaves, 40–80 mm (2–3 in) long and 20–30 mm (0.8–1 in) wide which form a loose rosette. Between five and thirty resupinate, dull green and white flowers, about 4 mm (0.2 in) long and 3 mm (0.1 in) wide are crowded on a fleshy, hairy, pinkish flowering stem 100–300 mm (4–10 in) tall. The outside surface of the flowers is hairy. The dorsal sepal is about 4 mm (0.2 in) long, 2 mm (0.08 in) wide and overlaps the petals forming a hood over the column. The dorsal sepal is green with pink edges, the lateral sepals are green and the petals are white. The lateral sepals and petals are about 3 mm (0.1 in) long and 1.5 mm (0.06 in) wide with the lateral sepals spreading apart from each other. The labellum is white, about 4 mm (0.2 in) long, 3.5 mm (0.1 in) wide with two lobes on the end. Flowering occurs from July to September.

== Taxonomy and naming ==
Zeuxine oblonga was first formally described in 1920 by Richard Sanders Rogers and Cyril Tenison White and the description was published in Proceedings of the Royal Society of Queensland. The specific epithet (oblonga) is a Latin word meaning "longer than broad".

== Distribution and habitat ==
Common jewel orchid is endemic to northern Australia and has been recorded from the far north-east of Western Australia, between the Keep and Adelaide Rivers in the Northern Territory and from the Cape York Peninsula in Queensland to Coffs Harbour in New South Wales. It usually grows in colonies on dark, moist sites on the rainforest floor, and is locally common in swampy areas with peaty soils next to streams.

== Conservation ==
In the Northern Territory Z. oblonga is listed as Vulnerable because there it has an estimated population size of fewer than 1000 individual plants, and an estimated area of occurrence of less than 20 km^{2} (8 mi^{2}) in the territory. Potential threats include feral animal disturbance, changes to hydrology and horticultural harvesting.

In Western Australia the species is classified as "Priority Two" by the Western Australian Government Department of Parks and Wildlife meaning that it is poorly known and from only one or a few locations.
