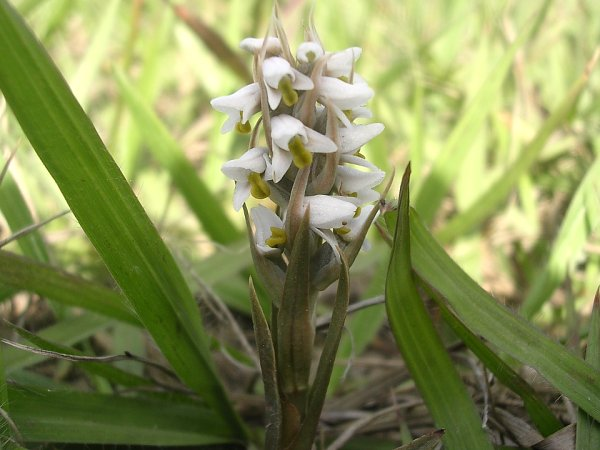
- Zeuxine strateumatica

Scientific classification
- Kingdom: Plantae
- Clade: Embryophytes
- Clade: Tracheophytes
- Clade: Spermatophytes
- Clade: Angiosperms
- Clade: Monocots
- Order: Asparagales
- Family: Orchidaceae
- Subfamily: Orchidoideae
- Tribe: Cranichideae
- Subtribe: Goodyerinae
- Genus: Zeuxine; Lindl.

Synonyms
- Adenostylis Blume; Haplochilus Endl.; Heterozeuxine T.Hashim.; Monochilus Wall. ex Lindl.; Psychechilos Breda; Strateuma Raf. nom. illeg.; Tripleura Lindl.; Zeuxinella Aver.

= Zeuxine =

Genus of orchids

Zeuxine, commonly known as verdant jewel orchids, is a genus of about eighty species of orchids in the tribe Cranichideae. They are native to parts of tropical Africa, Asia, Southeast Asia, New Guinea, Australia and some Pacific Islands. They have relatively narrow, dark green leaves and small, dull-coloured resupinate flowers with the dorsal sepal and petals overlapping to form a hood over the column. The labellum has a pouched base and its tip has two lobes.

== Description ==
Orchids in the genus Zeuxine are terrestrial, perennial, deciduous, sympodial herbs with a fleshy, creeping, above-ground rhizome anchored by wiry roots. The leaves are thinly textured and stalked, arranged in a rosette at the base of the flowering stem or scattered along it. Small, resupinate dull-coloured flowers are often crowded along the short flowering stem which usually has protruding bracts. The dorsal sepal and petals overlap, forming a hood over the column. The lateral sepals overlap the base of the labellum which is usually white, has a pouched base and a number of stalkless glands. The column is short with two stigmas.

== Taxonomy and naming ==
The genus Zeuxine was first formally described in 1826 by John Lindley who gave it the name Zeuxina but Zeuxine is the nom. cons. The description was published in the appendix of Collectanea Botanica. The name Zeuxine is derived from the Latin word zeuxis meaning "joining" or "yoking" in apparent reference to either the partly fused column or to the pollinia.

== Distribution and habitat ==
Plants in the genus Zeuxine usually grow in dark, moist forests where the humidity is always high or near swamps and seepage areas. They occur in tropical regions between Africa and Asia, in Southeast Asia, New Guinea, Australia and some Pacific Islands. Fourteen species are endemic to China and ten in Taiwan. Zeuxine strateumatica is naturalised on the Hawaiian Islands and in the south-eastern United States.

=== List of species ===
The following is a list of species of Zeuxine recognised by the Plants of the World Online as at October 2025:

- Zeuxine affinis (Lindl.) Benth. ex Hook.f.
- Zeuxine africana Rchb.f.
- Zeuxine agyokuana Fukuy.
- Zeuxine amboinensis (J.J.Sm.) J.J.Sm.
- Zeuxine andamanica King & Pantl.
- Zeuxine arisanensis Hayata
- Zeuxine baliensis J.J.Sm.
- Zeuxine ballii P.J.Cribb
- Zeuxine bifalcifera J.J.Sm.
- Zeuxine blatteri C.E.C.Fisch.
- Zeuxine boninensis Tuyama
- Zeuxine bougainvilleana Ormerod
- Zeuxine cambodiana (Gagnep.) Ormerod
- Zeuxine chowdheryi Av.Bhattacharjee & Sabap.
- Zeuxine clandestina Blume
- Zeuxine cordata (Lindl.) Ormerod
- Zeuxine diversifolia Ormerod
- Zeuxine elatior Schltr.
- Zeuxine elmeri (Ames) Ames
- Zeuxine elongata Rolfe
- Zeuxine erimae Schltr. in K.M.Schumann & C.A.G.Lauterbach
- Zeuxine eryliae Ormerod
- Zeuxine exilis Ridl.
- Zeuxine flava (Wall. ex Lindl.) Trimen
- Zeuxine fritzii Schltr.
- Zeuxine gengmanensis (K.Y.Lang) Ormerod
- Zeuxine gilgiana Kraenzl. & Schltr.
- Zeuxine glandulosa King & Pantl.
- Zeuxine goodyeroides Lindl.
- Zeuxine gracilis (Breda) Blume
- Zeuxine integrilabella C.S.Leou
- Zeuxine kantokeiensis Tatew. & Masam.
- Zeuxine kutaiensis J.J.Sm.
- Zeuxine lalashanensis S.S.Ying
- Zeuxine lancifolia (Ames) Ormerod
- Zeuxine leucoptera Schltr.
- Zeuxine leytensis (Ames) Ames
- Zeuxine lindleyana T.Cooke
- Zeuxine longilabris (Lindl.) Trimen
- Zeuxine lunulata P.J.Cribb & J.Bowden
- Zeuxine macrorhyncha Schltr.
- Zeuxine madagascariensis Schltr.
- Zeuxine mamiefoglianiae M.Pignal
- Zeuxine marivelensis (Ames) Ames
- Zeuxine membranacea Lindl.
- Zeuxine mindanaensis (Ames) Ormerod
- Zeuxine montana Schltr. in K.M.Schumann & C.A.G.Lauterbach
- Zeuxine mooneyi S.Misra
- Zeuxine nervosa (Wall. ex Lindl.) Benth. ex Trimen
- Zeuxine niijimai Tatew. & Masam.
- Zeuxine oblonga R.S.Rogers & C.T.White
- Zeuxine odorata Fukuy.
- Zeuxine ovalifolia L.Li & S.J.Li
- Zeuxine ovata (Gaudich.) Garay & W.Kittr.
- Zeuxine palawensis Tuyama
- Zeuxine palustris Ridl.
- Zeuxine papillosa Carr
- Zeuxine parvifolia (Ridl.) Seidenf.
- Zeuxine petakensis J.J.Sm.
- Zeuxine philippinensis (Ames) Ames
- Zeuxine plantaginea (Rchb.f.) Benth. & Hook.f. ex Drake
- Zeuxine pseudogracilis Ormerod
- Zeuxine purpurascens Blume
- Zeuxine reflexa King & Pantl.
- Zeuxine regia (Lindl.) Trimen
- Zeuxine reginasilvae Ormerod
- Zeuxine rolfeana King & Pantl.
- Zeuxine rupestris Ridl.
- Zeuxine samoensis Schltr.
- Zeuxine stammleri Schltr.
- Zeuxine stenophylla (Rchb.f.) Benth. & Hook.f. ex Drake
- Zeuxine strateumatica (L.) Schltr.
- Zeuxine subquadrata Ormerod
- Zeuxine tenuifolia Tuyama
- Zeuxine tjiampeana J.J.Sm.
- Zeuxine tonkinensis Gagnep.
- Zeuxine triangula J.J.Sm.
- Zeuxine vietnamica Aver.
- Zeuxine violascens Ridl.
- Zeuxine viridiflora (J.J.Sm.) Schltr.
  - Zeuxine viridiflora var. latifolia J.J.Sm.
  - Zeuxine viridiflora var. viridiflora.
- Zeuxine weberi (Ames) Ames
- Zeuxine wenzelii (Ames) Ormerod
- Zeuxine yehii T.C.Hsu
- Zeuxine zollingeri (Rchb.f.) Ormerod & Juswara
