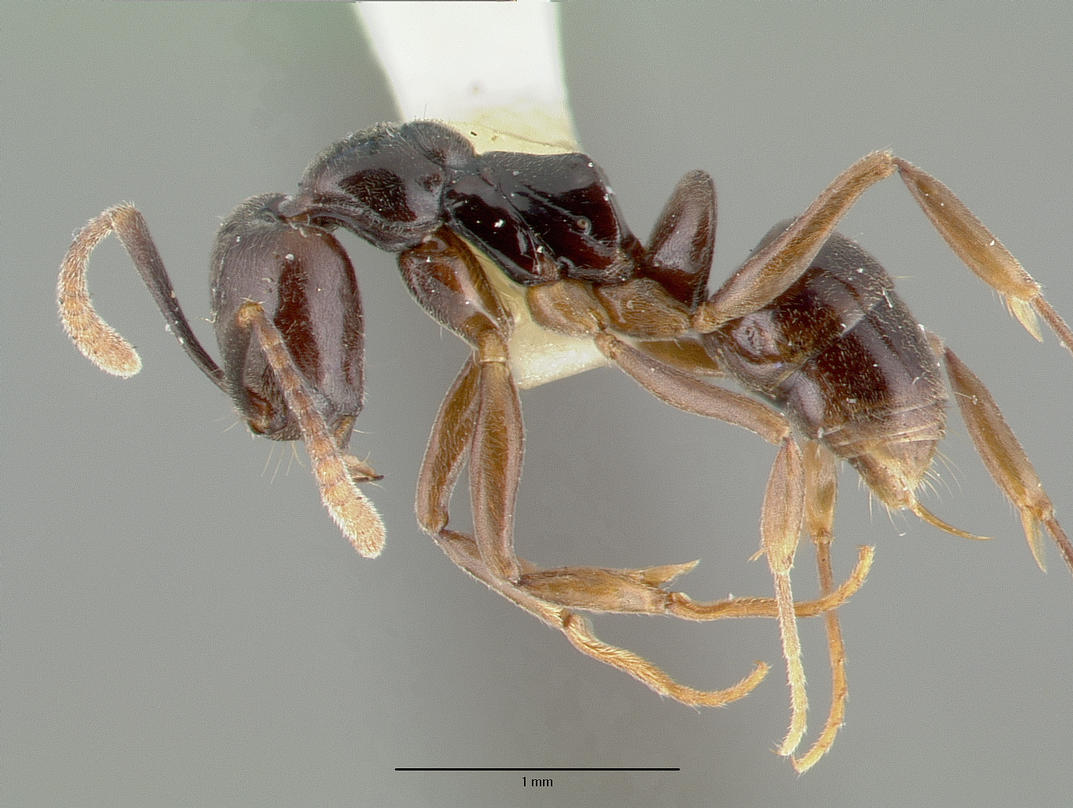
- Brachyponera croceicornis worker

Scientific classification
- Kingdom: Animalia
- Phylum: Arthropoda
- Class: Insecta
- Order: Hymenoptera
- Family: Formicidae
- Subfamily: Ponerinae
- Tribe: Ponerini
- Alliance: Odontomachus genus group
- Genus: Brachyponera; Emery, 1900

Type species
- Euponera croceicornis Emery, 1900

Diversity
- 19 species

= Brachyponera =

Genus of insects

Brachyponera is a genus of ants in the subfamily Ponerinae.

== Distribution ==
The genus is natively distributed from Africa to southern Asia and Australia, with most species occurring in Southeast Asia. At least two species are invasive in other parts of the world. B. chinensis, the most studied Brachyponera species, has been introduced as an exotic ant in southeastern United States and New Zealand. The other invasive species, B. sennaarensis, is spreading through the Middle East.

== Description ==
The genus was first established as a subgenus of Euponera, when Emery (1900) described B. croceicornis. Workers are small to medium in size (3–7 mm) and have triangular mandibles. Queens are similar to workers, but larger and winged.

== Species ==
- Brachyponera arcuata (Karavaiev, 1925)
- Brachyponera atrata (Karavaiev, 1925)
- Brachyponera batak (Yamane, 2007)
- Brachyponera brevidorsa Xu, 1994
- Brachyponera chinensis (Emery, 1895)
- Brachyponera christmasi (Donisthorpe, 1935)
- Brachyponera croceicornis (Emery, 1900)
- Brachyponera flavipes (Yamane, 2007)
- Brachyponera jerdonii (Forel, 1900)
- Brachyponera lutea (Mayr, 1862)
- Brachyponera luteipes (Mayr, 1862)
- Brachyponera mesoponeroides Radchenko, 1993
- Brachyponera nakasujii (Yashiro, Matsuura, Guénard, Terayama & Dunn, 2010)
- Brachyponera nigrita (Emery, 1895)
- Brachyponera obscurans (Walker, 1859)
- Brachyponera pilidorsalis (Yamane, 2007)
- Brachyponera sennaarensis (Mayr, 1862)
- Brachyponera tianzun (Terayama, 2009)
- Brachyponera wallacei (Yamane, 2007)
