= Water lily sign =

Pattern seen in radiologic examinations

Water lily sign is a radiologic sign seen in hydatid cyst infection. It refers to floating laminated membranes of the cyst within a dense fibrous cystic wall, resembling the appearance of a water lily in radiographs.
