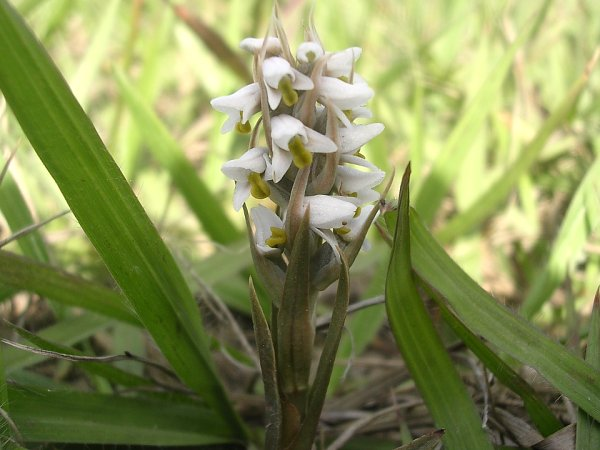

Conservation status
- Least Concern (IUCN 3.1)

Scientific classification
- Kingdom: Plantae
- Clade: Tracheophytes
- Clade: Angiosperms
- Clade: Monocots
- Order: Asparagales
- Family: Orchidaceae
- Subfamily: Orchidoideae
- Tribe: Cranichideae
- Genus: Zeuxine
- Species: Z. strateumatica

Binomial name
- Zeuxine strateumatica (Linnaeus) Schlechter

Synonyms
- Orchis strateumatica L., Sp. Pl. 2: 943. 1753; Adenostylis emarginata Blume; Adenostylis integerrima Blume; Adenostylis strateumatica (Linnaeus) Ames; Adenostylis sulcata (Roxburgh) Hayata; Neottia strateumatica (Linnaeus) R. Brown; Pterygodium sulcatum Roxburgh; Spiranthes strateumatica (Linnaeus) Lindley; Tripleura pallida Lindley; Zeuxine bonii Gagnepain; Zeuxine bracteata Wight; Zeuxine brevifolia Wight; Zeuxine emarginata (Blume) Lindley; Zeuxine integerrima (Blume) Lindley; Zeuxine procumbens Blume; Zeuxine robusta Wight; Zeuxine rupicola Fukuyama; Zeuxine stenochila Schlechter; Zeuxine strateumatica f. rupicola (Fukuyama) T. Hashimoto; Zeuxine strateumatica var. rupicola (Fukuyama) S. S. Ying; Zeuxine sulcata (Roxburgh) Lindley; Zeuxine tripleura Lindley; Zeuxine wariana Schlechter.

= Zeuxine strateumatica =

Species of orchid

Zeuxine strateumatica, common names lawn orchid or soldier orchid, is a species of terrestrial orchids. It is widespread across much of Asia, including China, Japan, Turkey, Uzbekistan, Iran, the Indian subcontinent, Afghanistan, and Southeast Asia, as well as in New Guinea and in some of the islands of the Pacific. It is naturalized in Saudi Arabia, Brazil, Tamaulipas (in northeastern Mexico), West Indies, Hawaii, California, and the southeastern United States from Texas to Georgia.

Zeuxine strateumatica is a perennial herb up to 25 cm tall. Leaves are linear or narrowly lanceolate, up to 9 cm long. Flowers are borne in an erect panicle of as many as 50 flowers, each white with a yellow lip.

It has an endomycorrhizal relationship with Rhizoctonia mucoroides.

In its natural habitat in Asia, Zeuxine strateumatica grows in grasslands, and along streambanks. In places where it is introduced, it frequently grows in lawns and agricultural fields, and is thus considered a nuisance weed.
