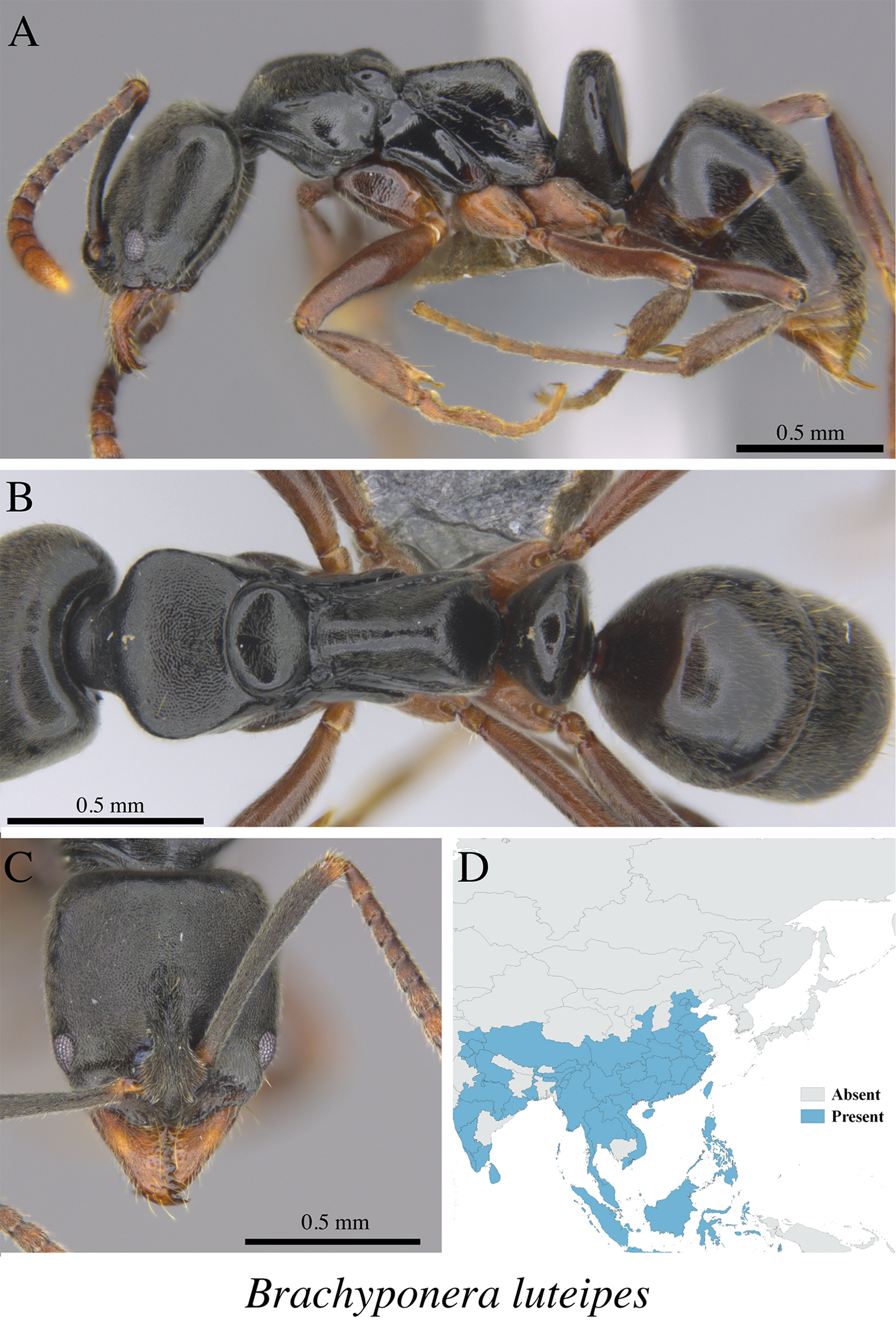

Scientific classification
- Domain: Eukaryota
- Kingdom: Animalia
- Phylum: Arthropoda
- Class: Insecta
- Order: Hymenoptera
- Family: Formicidae
- Genus: Brachyponera
- Species: B. luteipes

Binomial name
- Brachyponera luteipes (Mayr, 1862)

= Brachyponera luteipes =

Species of ant

Brachyponera luteipes is a species of ant of the subfamily Ponerinae. It is found in Nicobar Islands, Japan, Philippines, Indonesia, Sri Lanka, Myanmar, India, and Vietnam. Two subspecies are recognized.

== Subspecies ==
- Brachyponera luteipes continentalis Karavaiev, 1925 - India
- Brachyponera luteipes luteipes Karavaiev, 1925 - New Zealand, Borneo, Palau, Philippines, Bangladesh, India, Myanmar, Nicobar Islands, Sri Lanka, Thailand, Vietnam, China, Japan
