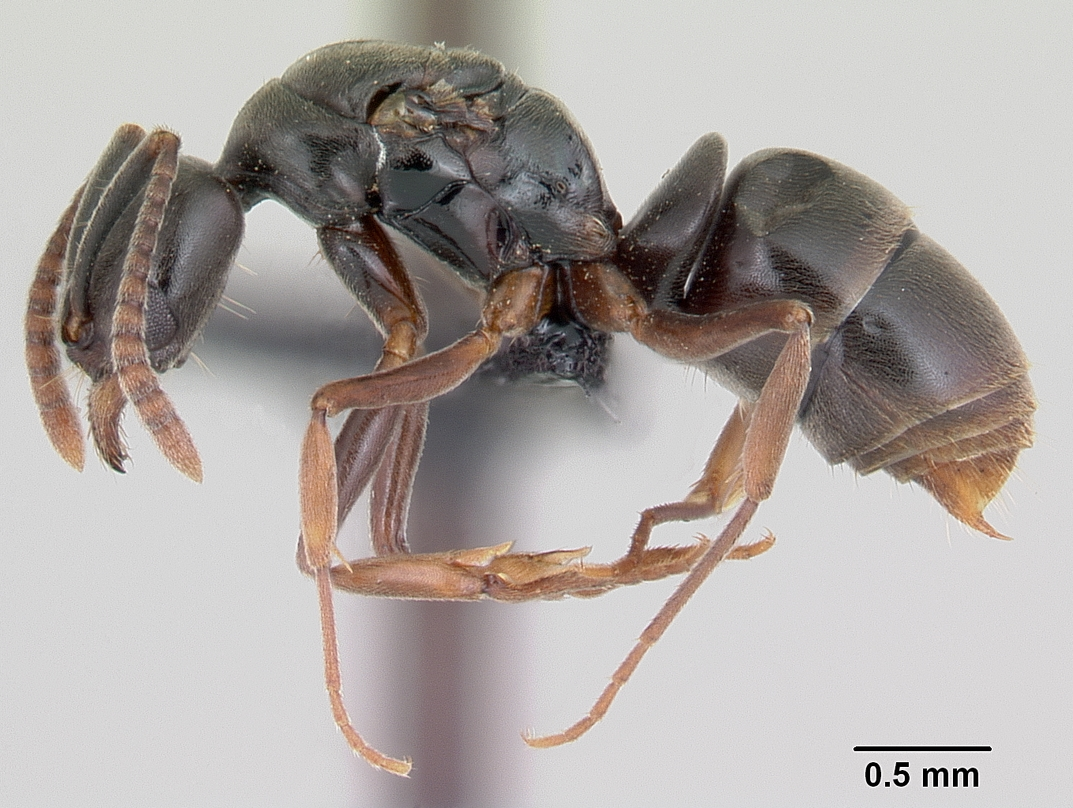

Scientific classification
- Kingdom: Animalia
- Phylum: Arthropoda
- Class: Insecta
- Order: Hymenoptera
- Family: Formicidae
- Genus: Brachyponera
- Species: B. obscurans

Binomial name
- Brachyponera obscurans (Walker, 1859)

= Brachyponera obscurans =

Species of ant

Brachyponera obscurans is a species of ant belonging to the subfamily Ponerinae. It is found in Borneo, Malaysia, New Guinea, Philippines, Mauritius, Sri Lanka, and China.
