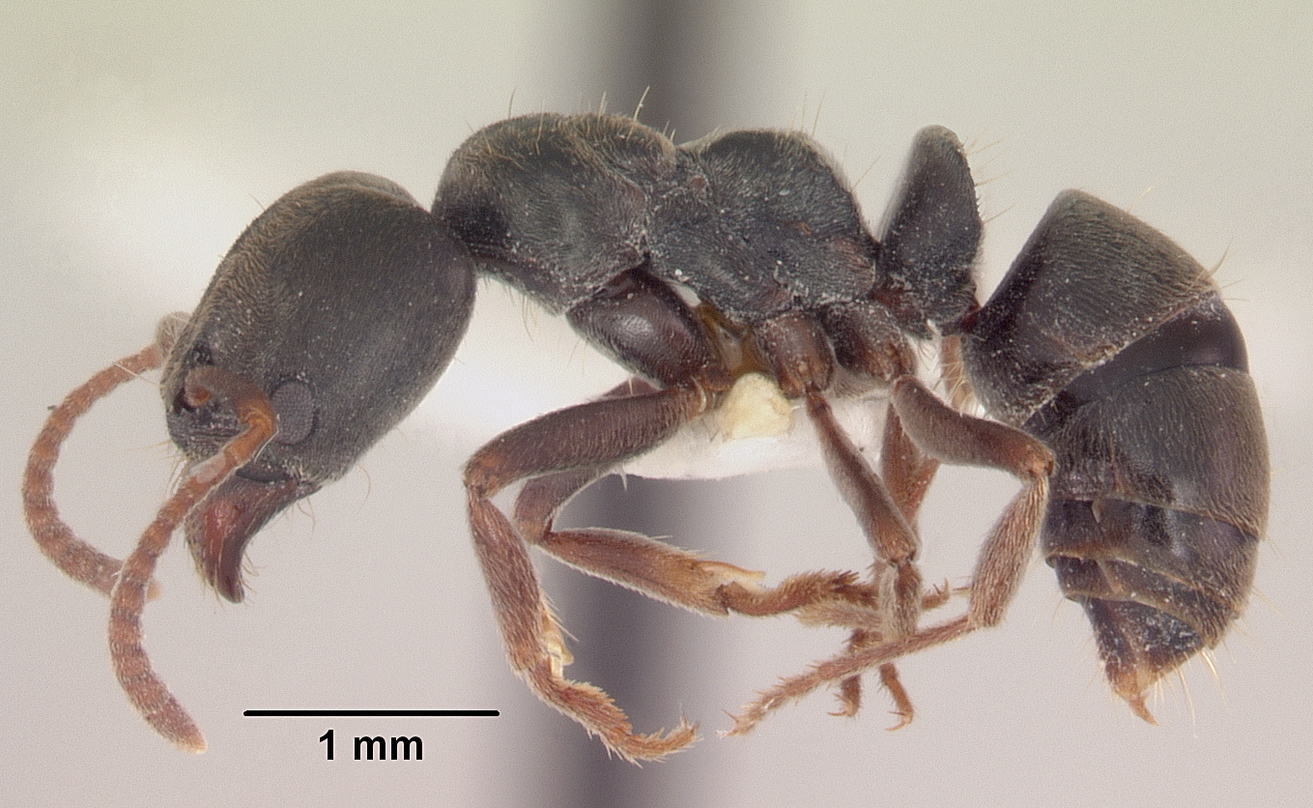
- A worker ant specimen

Scientific classification
- Kingdom: Animalia
- Phylum: Arthropoda
- Class: Insecta
- Order: Hymenoptera
- Family: Formicidae
- Genus: Brachyponera
- Species: B. sennaarensis

Binomial name
- Brachyponera sennaarensis (Mayr, 1862)
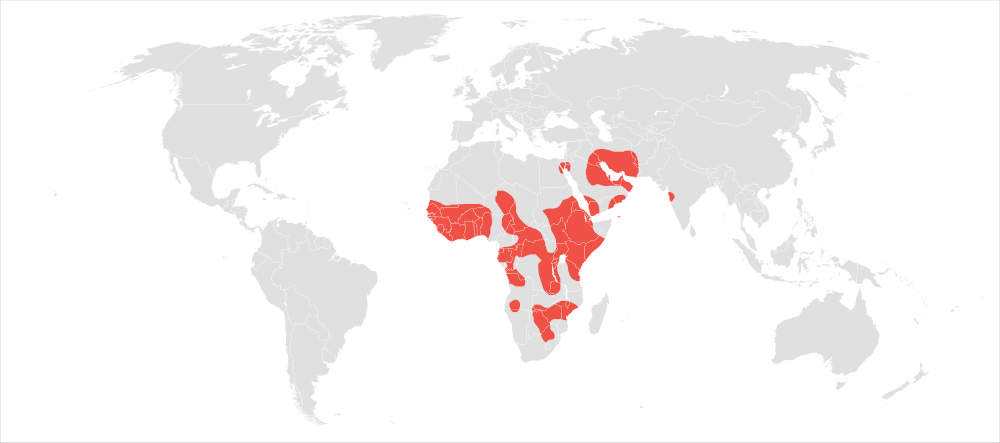
- Samsum ant range

= Samsum ant =

Species of ant

The samsum ant (Brachyponera sennaarensis, formerly known as Pachycondyla sennaarensis) is a species of ponerine ant widely distributed in Africa and the Middle East. A common household pest, the ant is a member of the genus Brachyponera. It was first described by Austrian entomologist Gustav Mayr in 1862. The ant is known for its powerful sting, in rare occasions leading to anaphylactic shock and death.

== Taxonomy ==
The samsum ant was first described by Austrian entomologist Gustav Mayr in his 1862 book Myrmecologische Studien, and was originally placed in the genus Ponera under the name Ponera sennaarensis. The type locality of the species is Sennar, Sudan. The species was categorized in the Brachyponera genus in 1901 by Italian entomologist Carlo Emery, under the name Brachyponera sennaarensis. Emery designated the ant as the type species of the genus, despite Brachyponera croceicornis being assigned as the type species by him a year prior.

In 1994, Brachyponera was synonymized with genus Pachycondyla, with the ant joining under the name Pachycondyla sennaarensis. In the mid 2010s, Brachyponera was revived to full genus status based on morphological and molecular analysis. The ant was again identified to be part of the Brachyponera genus, under the name Brachyponera sennaarensis. Samsum ants are ponerine ants.

== Distribution ==
Samsum ants are distributed throughout Africa, the Arabian Peninsula, and Iran. The ants are extensively distributed in Africa, and have been described as the most common ant species in Sudan by Levieux & Diomonde (1978). Originating from Northeast Africa, the species has been found in large populations in Burkina Faso, Cameroon, Democratic Republic of the Congo, Ethiopia, Gambia, Guinea, Iran, Niger, Nigeria, Saudi Arabia, Senegal, Somalia, the United Arab Emirates, and Yemen. It is an invasive species in the United Arab Emirates and Saudi Arabia, threatening endemic Arabian ant species. The species was also found in the United States in 1943. Its vast distribution around urban areas in Africa and Asia has led to its being described as a tropicopolitan and cosmopolitan species, and one of the most abundant animals in human settlements in those regions. Its widespread distribution has been attributed to it being one of the only ponerine species to be omnivorous, and having a flexible diet.

== Description ==
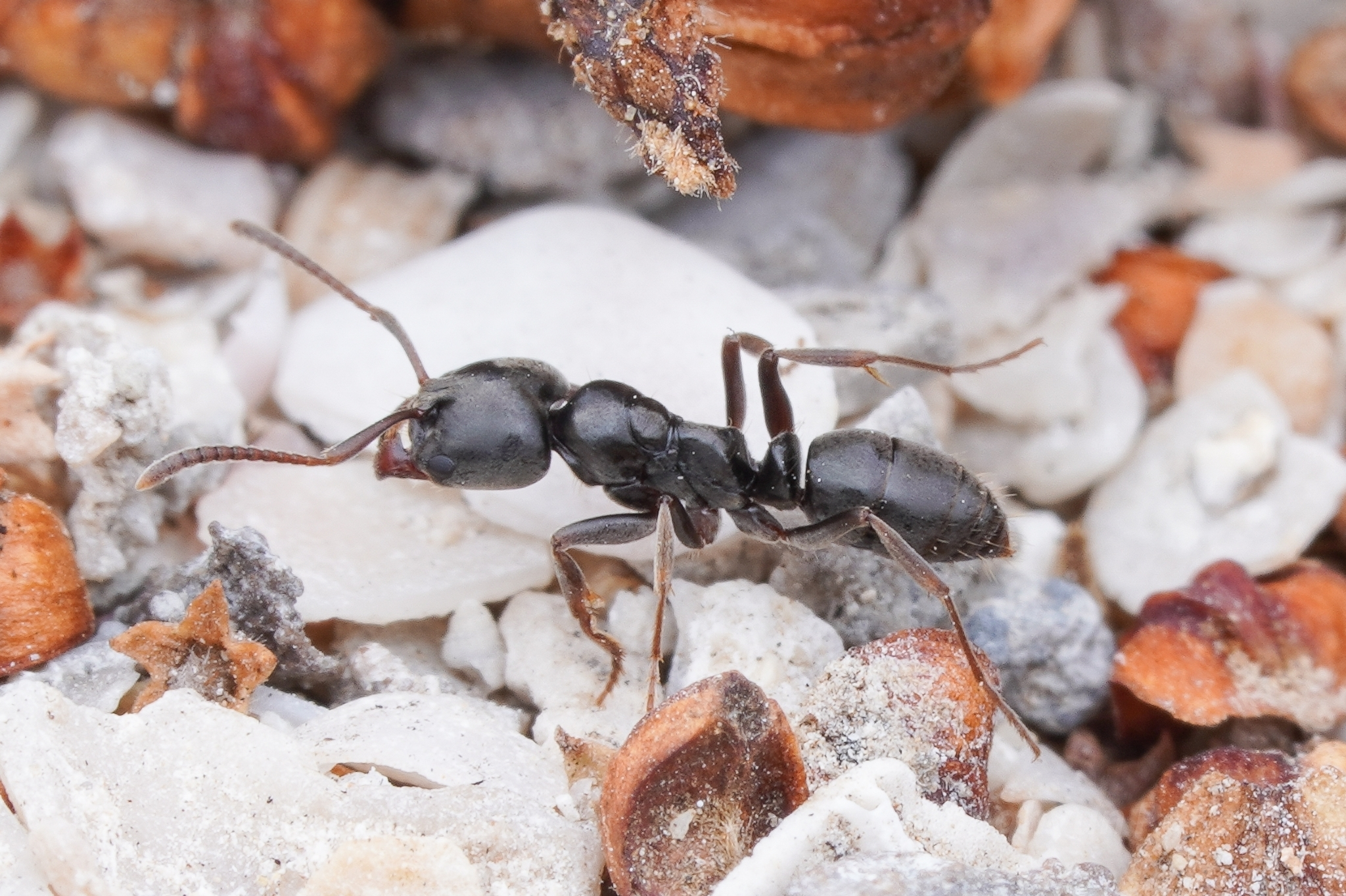
A samsum worker ant in Doha, Qatar

The samsum ant is 5–6 mm (3/16–1/4 inch) in length, and the body is dark brown to black-brown in colour, with the antenna, tarsi and tibia red in colour. The ant has a head broader than its mesosoma. Samsum ants are ground-dwelling species unable to climb smooth, vertical walls, as they lack adhesive pads on their tarsi and have small arolium glands. They have straight, pretarsal claws with an average claw tip angle of 56 degrees. Their ventral tarsal surface lack fine hairs. Samsum ants are polymorphic, having three castes: a male ant, a queen ant, and a worker ant. This species of ant is known for the size difference between workers and queen ants, considered rare within ponerine ant species.

The species is known under the common name "samsum ant" in the Middle East. The word "samsum" (Arabic: صمصام) means "sharp sword", likely referring to the ant's stinger, as the ant is known for its powerful stings, in rare cases leading to anaphylactic shock and death. The ants sting humans as a defensive measure, and cases of anaphylaxis caused by the ant's stings have been attributed to the ant globally. This has resulted in the species being termed as a common household pest in several regions, being one of the only ponerine ants to be considered invasive.

The samsum ant has winged male and female forms, with nuptial flights taking place shortly after rain. Large and small workers are found within the colony. In a study in Iran for the Journal of Zoology in the Middle East, researchers found colonies along irrigation ditches in damp grounds. The entrance of such nests were noted as being circular in shape and 3–5 mm (1/8–1/4 inch) in diameter. Samsum ants have large colonies, averaging at about 1,000 workers per colony. Samsum ants are omnivores and scavengers. They typically prey on small arthropods, including other species of ants, and occasionally larger arthropods such as cockroaches, using their stingers. They also feed on seeds of various plants, a unique behaviour within Ponerinae ants. The samsum ant is noted for its evolutionary transition from a carnivorous diet, like most ponerine ants, to an omnivorous one, incorporating seeds. The ants are flexible in their diet, shifting between granivorous and carnivorous diets, depending on environmental constraints.

== Sources ==
- Abdel-Dayem, Mahmoud; Al Dhafer, Hathal; Aldawood, Abdulrahman; Sharaf, Mostafa (27 May 2021). "An update to the taxonomy and distribution of the Arabian Tapinoma Foerster, 1850 (Hymenoptera: Formicidae) with an illustrated key and remarks on habitats". Biodiversity Data Journal. 9 e66058. doi:10.3897/BDJ.9.e66058. ISSN 1314-2828. PMC 8175323. PMID 34093057.
- Al-Khalifa, Mohammed Saleh; Mashaly, Ashraf Mohamed Ali; Siddiqui, Mohammed Iqbal; Al-Mekhlafi, Fahd Abdu (2015). "Samsum ant, Brachyponera sennaarensis (Formicidae: Ponerinae): Distribution and abundance in Saudi Arabia". Saudi Journal of Biological Sciences. 22 (5). Elsevier BV: 575–579. doi:10.1016/j.sjbs.2015.05.011. ISSN 1319-562X. PMC 4537870. PMID 26288561.
- Al-Khalifa, Mohammed Saleh; Ahmed, Ashraf Mohamed; Mashaly, Ashraf Mohamed Ali; Al-Mekhalfi, Fahad Abdu; Ali, Mahmoud Fadl (1 December 2010). "Studies on the Distribution of Pachycondyla sennaarensis (Hymenoptera: Formicidae: Ponerinae) in Saudi Arabia. 1. Ar-Riyadh Region". Pakistan Journal of Zoology. 42. ResearchersLinks Ltd: 707–713. ISSN 0030-9923.
- Al Anazi, Marzouqah; Al Ashahrani, Mohammad; Al Salamah, Majid (2009). "Black ant stings caused by Pachycondyla sennaarensis: a significant health hazard". Annals of Saudi Medicine. 29 (3): 207–211. doi:10.5144/0256-4947.2009.207. ISSN 0256-4947. PMC 2813646. PMID 19448369.
- Ashigar, Mohammed Ahmed; Ab Majid, Abdul Hafiz (30 November 2020). "Diversity, Abundance, and Foraging Behavior of Ants (Hymenoptera: Formicidae) Scavenging on American Cockroach in Various Habitats of Nasarawa State, Nigeria". Pertanika Journal of Tropical Agricultural Science. 43 (4). doi:10.47836/pjtas.43.4.07. ISSN 2231-8542.
- Billen, Johan; Al-Khalifa, Mohammed S.; Silva, Rogério R. (2017). "Pretarsus structure in relation to climbing ability in the ants Brachyponera sennaarensis and Daceton armigerum". Saudi Journal of Biological Sciences. 24 (4): 830–836. Bibcode:2017SJBS...24..830B. doi:10.1016/j.sjbs.2016.06.007. PMC 5415141. PMID 28490954.
- Billen, Johan; Al-Khalifa, Mohammed (2018). "Morphology and ultrastructure of the mandibular gland in the ant Brachyponera sennaarensis (Hymenoptera, Formicidae)". Micron. 104. Elsevier BV: 66–71. doi:10.1016/j.micron.2017.10.010. ISSN 0968-4328. PMID 29102797.
- Collingwood, Cedric A.; Tigar, Barbara J.; Agosti, Donat (1997). "Introduced ants in the United Arab Emirates". Journal of Arid Environments. 37 (3): 505–512. Bibcode:1997JArEn..37..505C. doi:10.1006/jare.1997.0309.
- Ebaid, Hossam; Al-Tamimi, Jameel; Hassan, Iftekhar; Alhazza, Ibrahim; Al-Khalifa, Mohamed (2014). "Antioxidant Bioactivity of Samsum Ant ( Pachycondyla sennaarensis ) Venom Protects against CCL 4 -Induced Nephrotoxicity in Mice". Oxidative Medicine and Cellular Longevity. 2014: 1–8. doi:10.1155/2014/763061. ISSN 1942-0900. PMC 3997132. PMID 24803985.
- Lachaud, Jean-Paul; Déjean, Alain (1994). "Predatory behavior of a seed-eating ant: Brachyponera senaarensis". Entomologia Experimentalis et Applicata. 72 (2): 145–155. Bibcode:1994EEApp..72..145L. doi:10.1111/j.1570-7458.1994.tb01812.x. ISSN 0013-8703.
- Lachaud, Jean-Paul; Pérez-Flores, Jonathan; Pérez-Lachaud, Gabriela (2019). "Opportunistic predation by leaf-cutting ants (Hymenoptera: Formicidae) on a wounded Baird's tapir (Mammalia: Perissodactyla: Tapiridae) in Mexico". The Florida Entomologist. 102 (1). Florida Entomological Society: 251–253. doi:10.1653/024.102.0145. ISSN 0015-4040. JSTOR 48562836.
- Lewis, D. J. (1958). "Medical Entomology in the Sudan Republic". Sudan Notes and Records. 39. University of Khartoum: 11–24. ISSN 0375-2984. JSTOR 41716776.
- Madl, M. (2019). "Notes on the ant fauna of Eritrea (Insecta: Hymenoptera: Formicidae) type specimens deposited in the Natural History Museum Vienna (Austria) and a preliminary checklist". Annalen des Naturhistorischen Museums in Wien. Serie B für Botanik und Zoologie. 121. Naturhistorisches Museum: 9–18. JSTOR 26596262.
- Mayr, G.L. (1862). Myrmecologische Studien (in German).
- Nikbakhtzadeh, MR; Akbarzadeh, K; Tirgari, S (2009). "Bioecology and Chemical Diversity of Abdominal Glands in the Iranian Samsum Ant Pachycondyla sennaarensis (Formicidae: Ponerinae)". Journal of Venomous Animals and Toxins Including Tropical Diseases. 15 (3): 509–526. doi:10.1590/S1678-91992009000300012. ISSN 1678-9199.
- Nikbakhtzadeh, Mahmood Reza; Tirgari, Siavosh; Fakoorziba, Mohammad Reza; Alipour, Hamzeh (2009). "Two volatiles from the venom gland of the Samsum ant, Pachycondyla sennaarensis". Toxicon. 54 (1): 80–82. Bibcode:2009Txcn...54...80N. doi:10.1016/j.toxicon.2009.03.005. PMID 19285997.
- Paknia, Omid (1 January 2006). "Distribution of the introduced ponerine ant Pachycondyla sennaarensis (Hymenoptera: Formicidae) in Iran". Myrmecological News. 8: 235–238. ISSN 1994-4136.
- Schmidt, C.A.; Shattuck, S. O. (18 June 2014). "The Higher Classification of the Ant Subfamily Ponerinae (Hymenoptera: Formicidae), with a Review of Ponerine Ecology and Behavior". Zootaxa. 3817 (1): 1–242. doi:10.11646/zootaxa.3817.1.1. ISSN 1175-5334. PMID 24943802.
- Sharaf, Mostafa R.; Wetterer, James K.; Mohamed, Amr A.; Aldawood, Abdulrahman S. (16 September 2022). "Faunal composition, diversity, and distribution of ants (Hymenoptera: Formicidae) of Dhofar Governorate, Oman, with updated list of the Omani species and remarks on zoogeography". European Journal of Taxonomy (838): 1925. Bibcode:2022EJTax.838.1925S. doi:10.5852/ejt.2022.838.1925. ISSN 2118-9773.
- Sharaf, Mostafa R.; Abdel-Dayem, Mahmoud S.; Mohamed, Amr A.; Fisher, Brian L.; Aldawood, Abdulrahman S. (30 December 2020). "A Preliminary Synopsis of the Ant Fauna (Hymenoptera: Formicidae) of Qatar with Remarks on the Zoogeography". Annales Zoologici. 70 (4). doi:10.3161/00034541ANZ2020.70.4.005.
- Smith, Marion R. (1943). "A Generic and Subgeneric Synopsis of the Male Ants of the United States". American Midland Naturalist. 30 (2): 273–321. doi:10.2307/2421283. JSTOR 2421283.
- Soorae, Pritpal; Javed, Salim; Alzaabi, Rashed; Al Dhaheri, Shaikha; Mehairbi, Al; Khan, Shahid; Omari, Al; Saji, S; Kabshawi, R; Ahmed, K (May 2018). A Guide to the Alien Species of the UAE - Their Pathways, Means of Introduction & Control Methods. Environment Agency-Abu Dhabi. ISBN 978-9948-10-165-9.
- Tirgari, Siavosh; Paknia, Omid (2005). "First record of the ponerine ant Pachycondyla sennaarensis (Hymenoptera: Formicidae) in Iran, with notes on its ecology". Zoology in the Middle East. 34 (1): 67–70. doi:10.1080/09397140.2005.10638084. ISSN 0939-7140.
- Weber, Neal A. (1940). "Ants on a Nile River Steamer". Ecology. 21 (2). [Wiley, Ecological Society of America]: 292–293. Bibcode:1940Ecol...21..292W. doi:10.2307/1930506. JSTOR 1930506.
- Wetterer, James K. (1 March 2013). "Geographic spread of the samsum or sword ant, Pachycondyla (Brachyponera) sennaarensis (Hymenoptera: Formicidae)". Myrmecological News. 18: 13–18. ISSN 1997-3500.
