= Charhyphus =

Scientific classification
- Kingdom: Animalia
- Phylum: Arthropoda
- Class: Insecta
- Order: Coleoptera
- Suborder: Polyphaga
- Infraorder: Staphyliniformia
- Family: Staphylinidae
- Genus: Charhyphus; Sharp, 1887

Genus of beetles

Charhyphus is a genus of beetles belonging to the family Staphylinidae.

The species of this genus are found in Northern America.

Species:

- Charhyphus arizonensis Herman, 1972
- Charhyphus brevicollis Sharp, 1887
- Charhyphus coeni (Scudder, 1900)
- Charhyphus paradoxus (Bernhauer, 1933)
- Charhyphus picipennis (LeConte, 1863)
