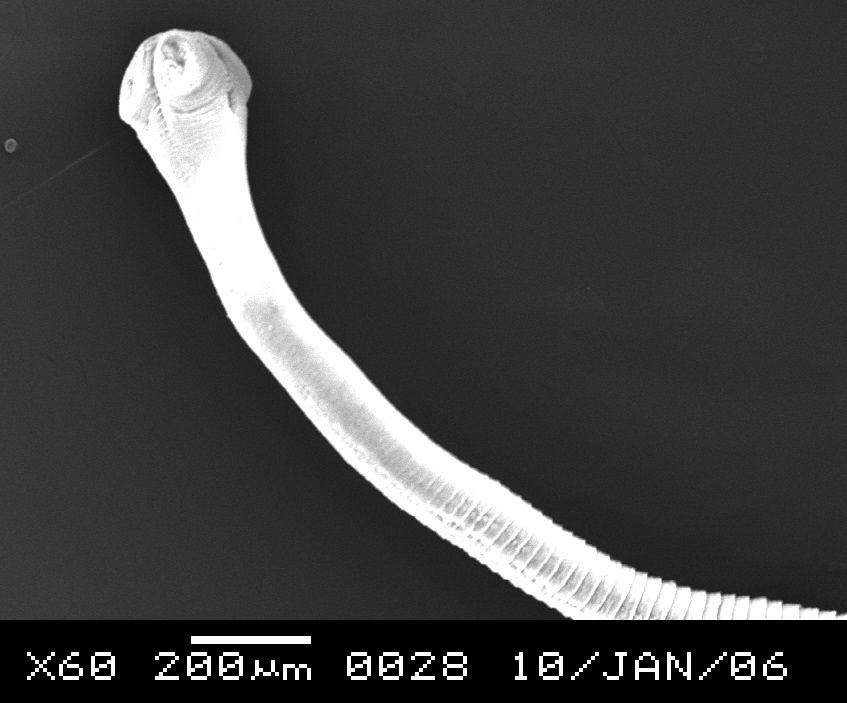
- SEM of Raillietina tetragona

Scientific classification
- Kingdom: Animalia
- Phylum: Platyhelminthes
- Class: Cestoda
- Order: Cyclophyllidea
- Family: Davaineidae; Braun, 1900

= Davaineidae =

Family of flatworms

Davaineidae is the name of a family of tapeworms that includes helminth parasites of vertebrates. Of the 14 genera recorded under this family, Raillietina is the best understood and most extensively studied. Members of the family are characterized by the presence of a crown (rostellum) at the tip of the scolex, and the rostellum is made up of mattock- or hammer-shaped hooks. The rostellum is surrounded by suckers which are armed with spines. These tapeworms are most commonly found in birds, and in few cases, mammals, which are the definitive hosts. Intermediate hosts are small insects such as ants. Hosts of Davainea proglottina (length 1 – 4 mm), for example, are chickens. Slugs are the intermediate hosts.

== Genera ==
- Calostaurus Sandars, 1957
- Cotugnia Diamare, 1893
- Davainea Blanchard, 1891
- Fernandezia Lopez-Neyra, 1936
- Fuhrmannetta Stiles & Orleman, 1926
- Houttuynia Fuhrmann, 1920
- Idiogenes Krabbe, 1868
- Ophryocotyle Friis, 1870
- Otiditaenia Beddard, 1912
- Paroniella Fuhrmann, 1920
- Paspalia Spasskaya & Spasskii, 1971
- Pseudidiogenes Movsesyan, 1971
- Raillietina Fuhrmann, 1920
- Skrjabinia Fuhrmann, 1920
