= Rostellum (helminth) =

Feature of tapeworm anatomy

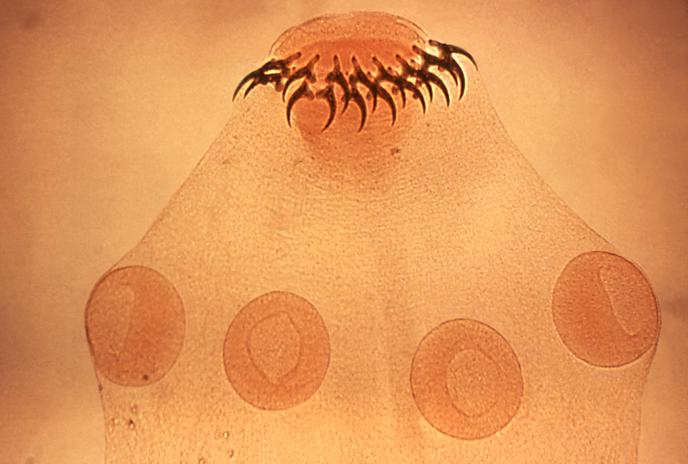
Taenia solium scolex with protruding rostellum

Rostellum /ˌrɑːˈstɛlʌm/ (meaning "small beak", from the Latin rostrum for "beak"; pl. rostella) in helminthology is a protruding part of the anterior end of tapeworms. It is a retractable, cone-like muscular structure that is located on the apical end of the scolex, and in most species is armed with hooks, the organs of attachment to the host's intestinal wall. It is a parasitic adaptation in some cestodes for firm attachment in the gastrointestinal tract and is structurally different from one species to another (or even absent in some species), thereby becoming an important diagnostic feature.

== Structure ==
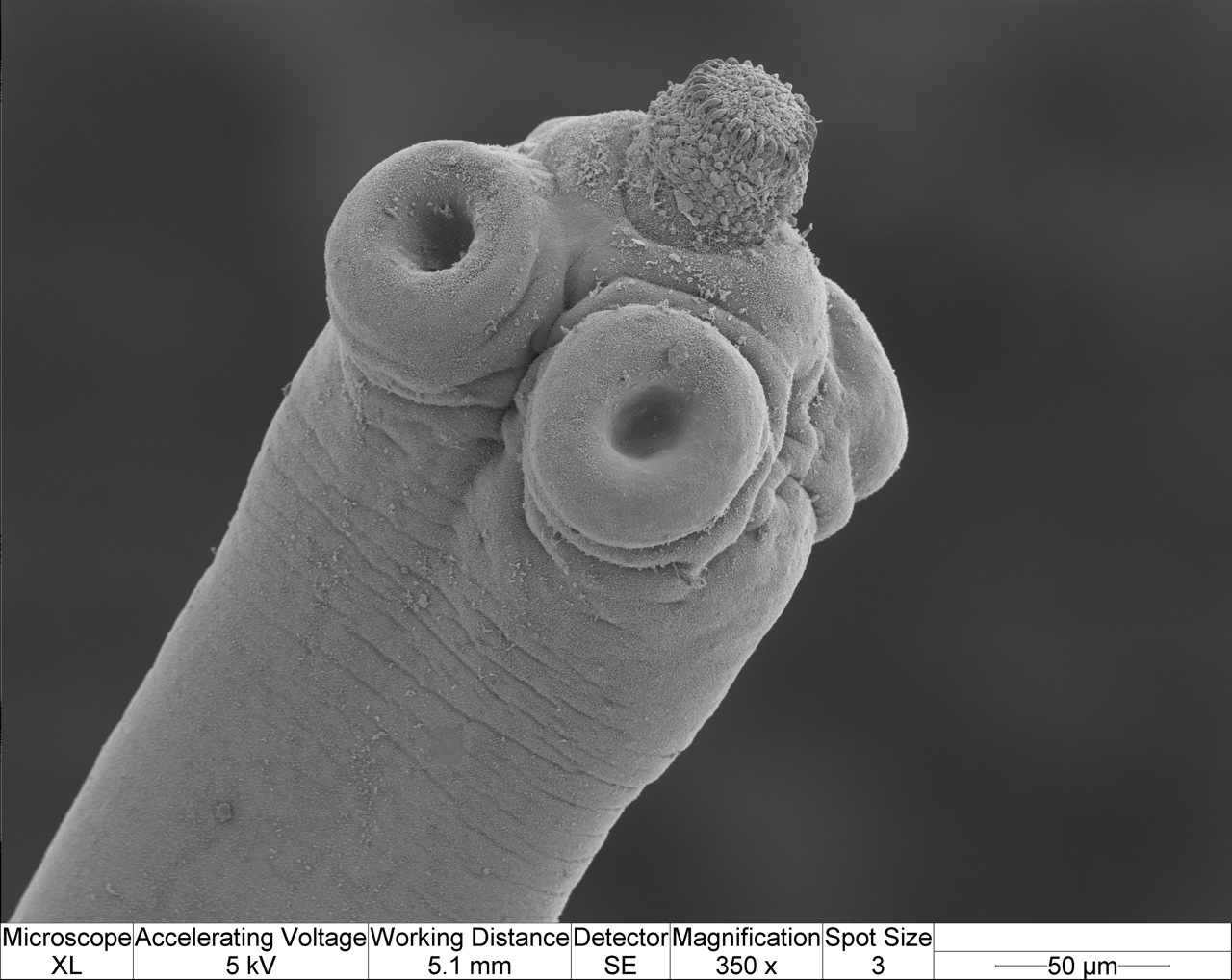
Scolex of the rodent tapeworm with rostellum at the tip

A rostellum is a knob-like protrusion at the extreme anterior end of a tapeworm, as an extension of the tegument. It is a globular, spiny structure when it protrudes, and a circular hollow pit when retracted. It is structurally composed of a number of concentric rows of hooks. The number and arrangement of the hooks are species specific. The two basic types of hooks are those of the upper row, which are larger and have a projecting, rounded stout guard, and those of the lower row, which are smaller and have a flattened guard. At the base, the hooks gradually resemble the general body hairs or microtriches. This shows that the hooks are modified microtriches. Electron-dense hook substance is deposited along the edges of the microthrix to form the hook blade and basal plate. The blade may be hollow or solid depending on the species. The base is connected to the underlying cytoplasm. Rostellum is innervated by a single bilateral pair of ganglia, which provide motor innervation of the anterior canal, and the circular muscles of the rostellar capsule; this connection controls the protrusion and retraction movements. The tegument lining the anterior canal and covering the apical rostellum is syncytial and continuous with the tegument of the scolex proper.

== Function ==
The rostellum is an organ of attachment of tapeworms, in addition to the surrounding suckers, to the intestinal wall of the host. It is protruded during attachment, and by the use of hooks penetrates the intestinal mucosa. This is particularly important during digestion of food and bowel movement of the host, so that the tapeworm is not expelled along with the faeces.
