= Tegument (helminth) =

Tegument /ˈtɛɡjʊmənt/ is a term in helminthology for the outer body covering of members of the phylum Platyhelminthes. The name is derived from a Latin word tegumentum or tegere, meaning "to cover". It is characteristic of flatworms including the broad groups of tapeworms and flukes. Once considered to be a non-living component, it is now known to be a dynamic cellular structure. In fact it is a living structure consisting of proteins, lipids, carbohydrates and RNA. It forms the protective layer and the host-parasite interface of the worms, serving both secretory and absorptive functions.

== Structure and composition ==
The fine structure of tegument is essentially the same in both the cestodes and trematodes. A typical tegument is 7-16 μm thick, with distinct layers. It is a syncytium consisting of multinucleated tissues with no distinct cell boundaries. The outer zone of the syncytium, called the "distal cytoplasm," is lined with a plasma membrane. This plasma membrane is in turn associated with a layer of carbohydrate-containing macromolecules known as the glycocalyx, that varies in thickness from one species to another. The distal cytoplasm is connected to the inner layer called the "proximal cytoplasm", which is the "cellular region or cyton or perikarya" through cytoplasmic tubes that are composed of microtubules. The proximal cytoplasm contains nuclei, endoplasmic reticulum, Golgi complex, mitochondria, ribosomes, glycogen deposits, and numerous vesicles. The internal most layer is bounded by a layer of connective tissue known as the "basal lamina". The basal lamina is followed by a thick layer of muscle.

A large number of important enzymes has been detected in the tegument. Glutathione S-transferase, ATP diphosphorylase, alkaline and acid phosphatases, β-glucuronidase, amino peptidase, acetylcholine esterase, phosphofructokinase, glucose transporters, serine hydrolases and several glycolytic enzymes have been detected with their biological roles.

The external surface of tegument is associated with unique defining structures in cestodes and trematodes. In cestodes the tegument is further covered with highly specialized microvilli, called "microtriches", projecting from the outer limiting membrane of the tegument. These microtriches are fine hair-like filaments distributed throughout the surface of the body, and give the body surface a smooth and silky appearance. Since cestodes are devoid of any digestive and excretory systems, the tegument with its microtriches constitute the principal site of absorption of nutrients and elimination of waste materials. In fact the tegument highly resembles the gut of animals turned inside out.

In trematodes the tegument contains a number of invaginations or surface pits, and is externally lined with minute tubercles among which are dispersed bristle-like projections called "spines". Spines are embedded in the basal lamina and the tip is finely pointed to the external surface. They are made up of paracrystalline arrays of actin filaments. Tubercles are numerous, fairly regularly arranged, rounded protuberances.

== Functions ==
The tegument is the host-parasite interface, and metabolically active body covering performing all the vital activities such as protection, absorption and secretion. The glycocalyx is responsible for inhibition of the host digestive enzymes, absorption of cations and bile salts, and enhancement of the host amylase activity. The acidic glycosaminoglycans of the glycocalyx are specific for inhibiting a number of digestive enzymes of the host. The microtriches in cestodes, and pits and spines in trematodes increase the surface area of the teguments for enhanced absorption of nutrients. In addition, they act as sensory organs for detecting the surrounding environmental cues. The capacity of the tegument to absorb exogenous materials is proportional to the number and extent of pits or microtriches and the number of mitochondria in the distal cytoplasm.

== See also ==
- Platyhelminthes
- Trematoda
- Cestoda
