= Fasciolopsiasis =

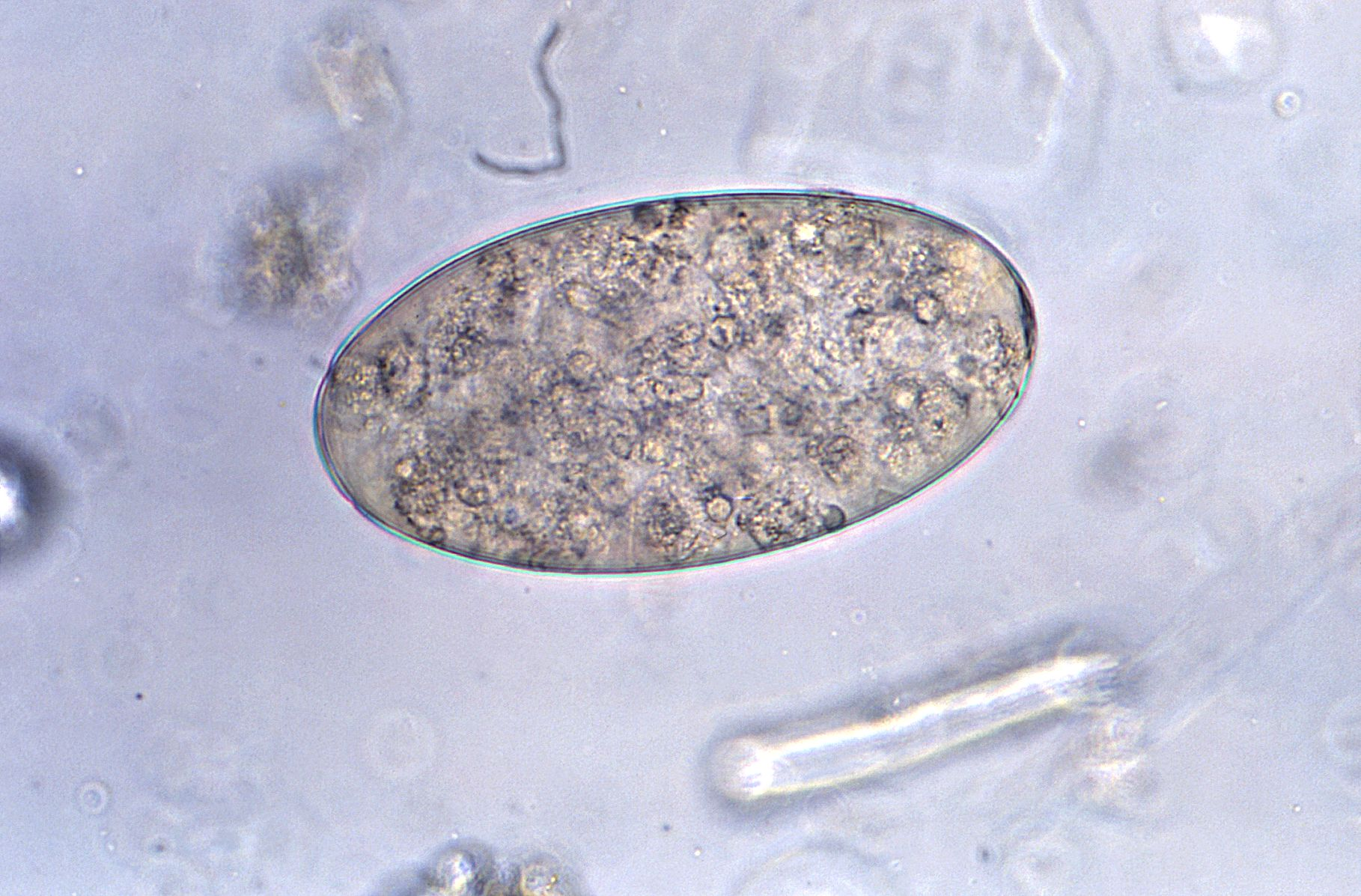
- Eggs of Fasciolopsis buski
- Specialty: Infectious diseases

Fasciolopsiasis results from an infection by the trematode Fasciolopsis buski, the largest intestinal fluke of humans, growing up to 7.5 cm (3.0 in) long.

== Signs and symptoms ==
Most infections are light, almost asymptomatic. In heavy infections, symptoms can include abdominal pain, chronic diarrhea, anemia, ascites, toxemia, and allergic responses. Sensitization caused by the absorption of the worms' allergenic metabolites can lead to intestinal obstruction and may eventually cause the death of the patient.

== Cause ==
The parasite infects amphibious snails (such as Segmentina nitidella, Segmentina hemisphaerula, Hippeutis schmackerie, Gyraulus, Lymnaea, Pila and Planorbis (Indoplanorbis)) after being released by infected mammalian feces; metacercaria released from this intermediate host encyst on aquatic plants like water spinach, which are eaten raw by pigs and humans. Water itself can also be infective when drunk unboiled ("Encysted cercariae exist not only on aquatic plants, but also on the surface of the water.").

== Diagnosis ==
Microscopic identification of eggs, or more rarely of the adult flukes, in the stool or vomitus is the basis of specific diagnosis. The eggs are indistinguishable from those of the very closely related Fasciola hepatica liver fluke, but that is largely inconsequential since treatment is essentially identical for both.

== Prevention ==
Infection can be prevented by immersing vegetables in boiling water for a few seconds to kill the infective metacercariae, avoiding the use of untreated feces ("nightsoil") as a fertilizer, and maintenance of proper sanitation and good hygiene. Additionally, snail control should be attempted.

== Treatment ==
Praziquantel is the drug of choice for treatment. Treatment is effective in early or light infections. Heavy infections are more difficult to treat. Studies of the effectiveness of various drugs for treatment of children with F. buski have shown tetrachloroethylene as capable of reducing faecal egg counts by up to 99%. Other anthelmintics that can be used include thiabendazole, mebendazole, levamisole and pyrantel pamoate. Oxyclozanide, hexachlorophene and nitroxynil are also highly effective.

== Epidemiology ==
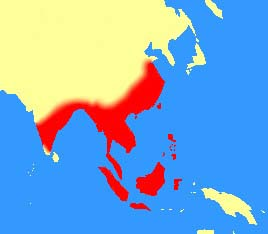
Distribution of Fasciolopsis buski

F. buski is endemic in Asia including China, Taiwan, Southeast Asia, Indonesia, Malaysia, and India. It has an up to 60% prevalence in worst-affected communities in southern and eastern India and mainland China and has caused an estimated 10 million human infections. Infections occur most often in school-aged children or in impoverished areas with a lack of proper sanitation systems.

A study from 1950s found that F. buski was endemic in central Thailand, affecting about 2,936 people due to infected aquatic plants called water caltrops and the snail hosts which were associated with them. The infection, or the eggs which hatch in the aquatic environment, were correlated with the water pollution in different districts of Thailand such as Ayuthaya Province. The high incidence of infection was prevalent in females and children ages 10–14 years of age.
