= Epsiprantel =

Chemical compound

Clinical data
- Trade names: Cestex
- Other names: BRL 38705
- Routes of administration: By mouth
- ATCvet code: QP52AA04 (WHO) QP52AA54 (WHO)

Legal status
- Legal status: US: ℞-only

Pharmacokinetic data
- Bioavailability: Minimal

Identifiers
- IUPAC name: 2-(Cyclohexylcarbonyl)-2,3,6,7,8,12b-hexahydropyrazino[2,1-a][2]benzazepin-4(1H)-one
- CAS Number: 98123-83-2
- PubChem CID: 72026
- ChemSpider: 65020
- UNII: 0C1SPQ0FSR
- ChEMBL: ChEMBL64979
- CompTox Dashboard (EPA): DTXSID3057858

Chemical and physical data
- Formula: C_{20}H_{26}N_{2}O_{2}
- Molar mass: 326.440 g·mol^{−1}
- 3D model (JSmol): Interactive image
- SMILES: O=C4N2C(c1c(cccc1)CCC2)CN(C(=O)C3CCCCC3)C4
- InChI: InChI=1S/C20H26N2O2/c23-19-14-21(20(24)16-8-2-1-3-9-16)13-18-17-11-5-4-7-15(17)10-6-12-22(18)19/h4-5,7,11,16,18H,1-3,6,8-10,12-14H2; Key:LGUDKOQUWIHXOV-UHFFFAOYSA-N

Epsiprantel (trade name Cestex) is a veterinary drug which is used as an anthelmintic against tapeworms such as Echinococcus granulosus.

== Indications ==
It is indicated for the removal of cestodes (tapeworms) in cats (Dipylidium caninum and Taenia taeniaeformis) and dogs (Dipylidium caninum and Taenia pisiformis) 7 weeks of age and older.
