= Feline tapeworm =

The term feline tapeworm may refer to:

- Dipylidium caninum, a tapeworm often infesting domestic cats whose intermediate host is parasitic fleas
- Taenia taeniaeformis, a similar worm whose intermediate host is rodents
