= Fenbendazole =

Chemical compound

Clinical data
- AHFS/Drugs.com: International Drug Names
- License data: US DailyMed: Fenbendazole
- ATC code: P02CA06 (WHO) QP52AC13 (WHO)

Identifiers
- IUPAC name: Methyl N-(6-phenylsulfanyl-1H-benzoimidazol-2-yl)carbamate
- CAS Number: 43210-67-9
- PubChem CID: 3334
- ChemSpider: 3217
- UNII: 621BVT9M36
- KEGG: D04140
- ChEBI: CHEBI:77092
- ChEMBL: ChEMBL37161
- CompTox Dashboard (EPA): DTXSID0040672
- ECHA InfoCard: 100.051.024

Chemical and physical data
- Formula: C_{15}H_{13}N_{3}O_{2}S
- Molar mass: 299.35 g·mol^{−1}
- 3D model (JSmol): Interactive image
- SMILES: COC(=O)Nc3nc2ccc(Sc1ccccc1)cc2[nH]3
- InChI: InChI=1S/C15H13N3O2S/c1-20-15(19)18-14-16-12-8-7-11(9-13(12)17-14)21-10-5-3-2-4-6-10/h2-9H,1H3,(H2,16,17,18,19); Key:HDDSHPAODJUKPD-UHFFFAOYSA-N

Fenbendazole is a broad-spectrum benzimidazole anthelmintic used against gastrointestinal parasites including: roundworms, hookworms, whipworms, the tapeworm genus Taenia (but not effective against Dipylidium caninum, a common dog tapeworm), pinworms, Aelurostrongylus spp., paragonimiasis, strongyles, and strongyloides that can be administered to sheep, cattle, horses, fish, dogs, cats, rabbits, most reptiles, freshwater shrimp tanks as planaria and hydra treatments, and seals.

It has not been tested or approved for use in humans by the FDA or EMA. Related benzimidazole drugs such as mebendazole and albendazole are used in humans.

Some laboratory research has shown promising results for fenbendazole and mebendazole as anticancer drugs. Exaggerated information has circulated on social media promoting fenbendazole as a miracle cancer cure. However, the possible use of fenbendazole against cancer is still at the stage of very early laboratory research, and should not be attempted without a doctor's approval and supervision. Misuse of fenbendazole can cause liver damage.

== Mechanism of action ==
Fenbendazole works by binding to tubulin, a protein that is part of the microtubules in the cells of parasites. This binding disrupts the microtubules' formation and function, leading to the parasites' inability to absorb nutrients, resulting in their eventual death. This mode of action makes fenbendazole effective against both adult and larval stages of many parasitic worms.

== Uses in veterinary medicine ==
=== Dogs and cats ===
Fenbendazole is commonly used to treat intestinal parasites, including roundworms, hookworms, whipworms, and certain tapeworms. It is often administered as part of a broader deworming protocol.

=== Horses ===
In equine medicine, fenbendazole is used to control strongyles, pinworms, and ascarids. It is available in paste form for easy administration.

=== Cattle and goats ===
Fenbendazole is effective against lungworms, stomach worms, and intestinal worms in ruminants. It is administered through feed, drenching, or bolus form.

== Drug interactions ==
Drug interactions may occur if salicylanilides such as dibromsalan and niclosamide are co-administered. Abortions in cattle and death in sheep have been reported after using these medications together. Abortions in domestic ruminants have been associated with concurrent use of antitrematode therapeutic agents.

== Toxicity ==
Fenbendazole is poorly absorbed from the gastrointestinal tract in most species. The LD_{50} in laboratory animals exceeds 10 g/kg when administered orally.

== Metabolism ==
Fenbendazole is metabolized in the liver to oxfendazole, which is anthelmintic, too; oxfendazole partially gets reduced back to fenbendazole in the liver and rumen. Also, fenbendazole itself is an active metabolite of another anthelmintic drug, febantel.

== Safety and precautions ==
Fenbendazole is generally safe when used as directed, but following veterinary guidelines and dosage instructions to avoid potential side effects is important. Some animals may experience mild gastrointestinal upset. It is not recommended for use in pregnant animals without veterinary advice. In treatment in dogs that go on for longer than the label recommendation, there have been reports of bone marrow hypoplasia and pancytopenia occurring.

Two case reports describe dangerous liver injury in human patients taking fenbendazole off-label. When they stopped taking the drug, the liver injury resolved.

== Research directions ==
Fenbendazole has been proposed for repurposing as an anticancer drug due to its ability to disrupt energy metabolism in cancer cells and induce cell death through multiple mechanisms. Early results with fenbendazole and the related drug mebendazole are somewhat promising, from in vitro studies, animal studies and a few case reports from people who took it off-label. Fenbendazole's poor bioavailability when administered orally, though, remains a challenge for its use as a cancer treatment. Some patients taking fenbendazole off-label without a doctor's supervision suffered potentially dangerous liver dysfunction, although this resolved after stopping taking the drug.

Exaggerated reports have circulated on social media that fenbendazole is a "miracle cure" for cancers, often with the use of florid testimonials. This information, however, is often less conclusive than it appears, such as reports from patients who were taking fenbendazole alongside conventional drugs, radiation and/or surgery, making it impossible to tell what caused their recovery.

== See also ==
- Ivermectin – Medication for parasite infestations
- List of unproven and disproven cancer treatments – Other things falsely promoted as cancer treatment
- Nocodazole – Microtubule depolymerizing drug
- Praziquantel – Anti-parasite medication
