= Cat tapeworm =

The term cat tapeworm may refer to:

- Dipylidium caninum, a tapeworm often infesting domestic dogs and cats whose intermediate host is parasitic fleas
- Taenia taeniaeformis, a similar worm whose intermediate host is rodents and lagomorphs.
