= Octadepsipeptide =

Octadepsipeptide may refer to:

- Emodepside
- Anthelmintic
