= ATCvet code QP52 =

ATCvet code QP52 Anthelmintics is a therapeutic subgroup of the Anatomical Therapeutic Chemical Classification System for veterinary medicinal products, a system of alphanumeric codes developed by the World Health Organization (WHO) for the classification of drugs and other medical products for veterinary use. Subgroup QP52 is part of the anatomical group QP Antiparasitic products, insecticides and repellents.

National versions of the ATC classification may include additional codes not present in this list, which follows the WHO version.

== QP52A Anthelmintics ==
=== QP52AA Quinoline derivatives and related substances ===
QP52AA01 Praziquantel
QP52AA02 Oxamniquine
QP52AA04 Epsiprantel
QP52AA30 Combinations of quinoline derivatives and related substances
QP52AA51 Praziquantel, combinations
QP52AA54 Epsiprantel, combinations

=== QP52AB Organophosphorous compounds ===
QP52AB01 Metrifonate
QP52AB02 Bromfenofos
QP52AB03 Dichlorvos
QP52AB04 Haloxon
QP52AB06 Naftalofos
QP52AB51 Metrifonate, combinations

=== QP52AC Benzimidazoles and related substances ===
QP52AC01 Triclabendazole
QP52AC02 Oxfendazole
QP52AC03 Parbendazole
QP52AC04 Thiophanate
QP52AC05 Febantel
QP52AC06 Netobimine
QP52AC07 Oxibendazole
QP52AC08 Cambendazole
QP52AC09 Mebendazole
QP52AC10 Tiabendazole
QP52AC11 Albendazole
QP52AC12 Flubendazole
QP52AC13 Fenbendazole
QP52AC30 Combinations of benzimidazoles and related substances
QP52AC52 Oxfendazole, combinations
QP52AC55 Febantel, combinations
QP52AC57 Oxibendazole, combinations
QP52AC59 Mebendazole, combinations

=== QP52AE Imidazothiazoles ===
QP52AE01 Levamisole
QP52AE02 Tetramisole
QP52AE30 Combinations of imidazothiazoles
QP52AE51 Levamisole, combinations
QP52AE52 Tetramisole, combinations

=== QP52AF Tetrahydropyrimidines ===
QP52AF01 Morantel
QP52AF02 Pyrantel
QP52AF03 Oxantel
QP52AF30 Combinations of tetrahydropyrimidines

=== QP52AG Phenol derivatives, including salicylanilides ===
QP52AG01 Dichlorophene
QP52AG02 Hexachlorophene
QP52AG03 Niclosamide
QP52AG04 Resorantel
QP52AG05 Rafoxanide
QP52AG06 Oxyclozanide
QP52AG07 Bithionol
QP52AG08 Nitroxinil
QP52AG09 Closantel

=== QP52AH Piperazine and derivatives ===
QP52AH01 Piperazine
QP52AH02 Diethylcarbamazine

=== QP52AX Other anthelmintic agents ===
QP52AX01 Nitroscanate
QP52AX02 Bunamidine hydrochloride
QP52AX03 Phenothiazine
QP52AX04 Dibutyltindilaurate
QP52AX05 Destomycin A
QP52AX06 Halodone
QP52AX07 Butylchoride
QP52AX08 Thiacetarsamid
QP52AX09 Monepantel
QP52AX60 Emodepside and toltrazuril

== QP52B Agents against trematodosis, optional classification ==
Empty group

== QP52C Agents against nematodosis, optional classification ==
Empty group

== QP52D Agents against cestodosis, optional classification ==
Empty group

== QP52X Other anthelmintic agents, optional classification ==
Empty group
