= Taenia taeniaeformis =

Scientific classification
- Kingdom: Animalia
- Phylum: Platyhelminthes
- Class: Cestoda
- Order: Cyclophyllidea
- Family: Taeniidae
- Genus: Taenia
- Species: T. taeniaeformis

Binomial name
- Taenia taeniaeformis Batsch, 1786

Synonyms
- Hydatigera taeniaeformis (Batsch, 1786)

Species of flatworm

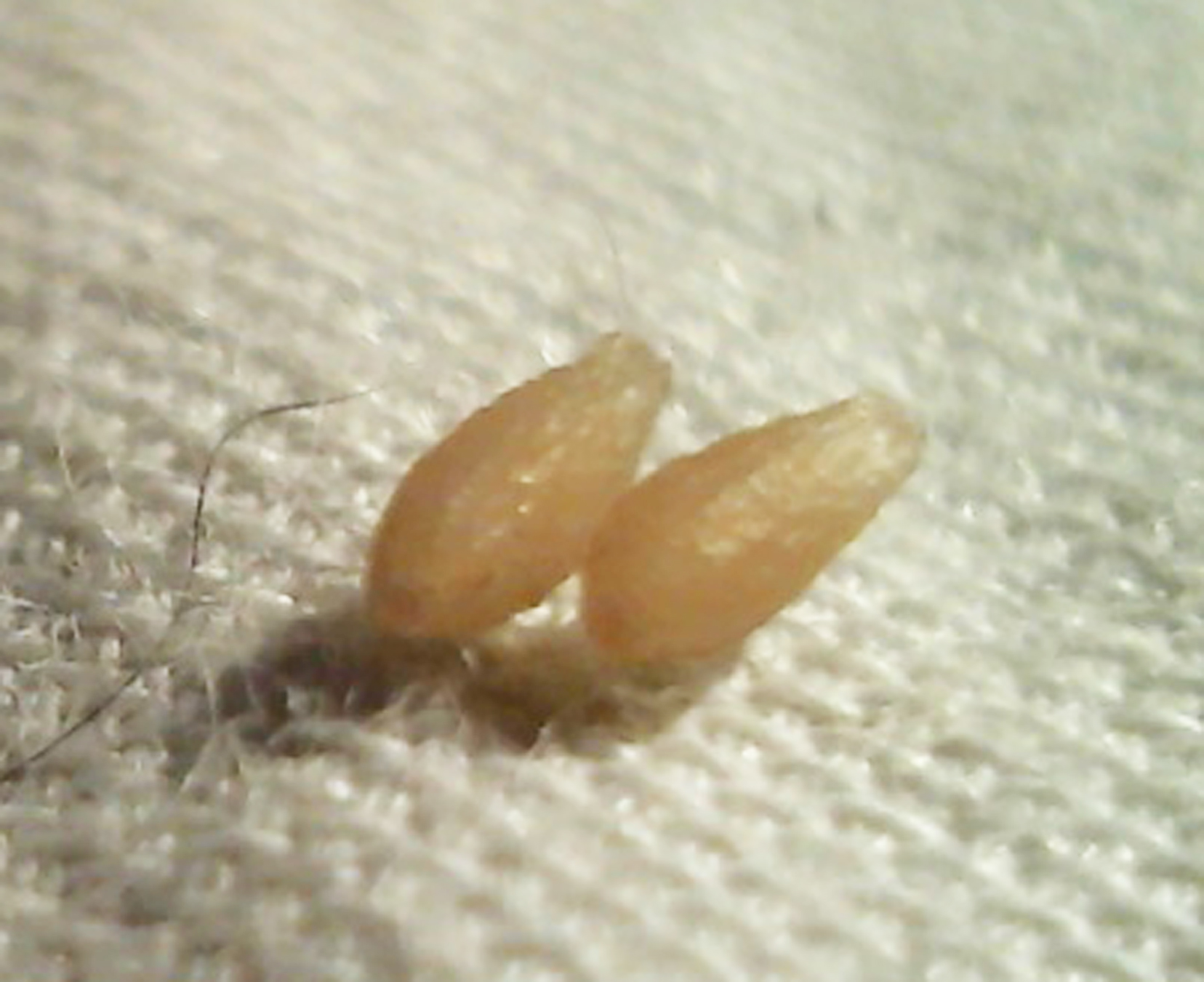
A pair of tapeworm proglottids.

Taenia taeniaeformis is a parasitic tapeworm, with cats as the primary definitive hosts. Sometime dogs can also be the definitive host. The intermediate hosts are rodents and less frequently lagomorphs (rabbits). The definitive host must ingest the liver of the intermediate host in order to acquire infection. The worm tends to be white, thick bodied, and around 15 to 60 cm in length. This species of tape worm is much less frequently encountered than Dipylidium caninum, which has fleas as its intermediate host rather than rodents but exhibits most of the same physical characteristics and is treated with the same medications (i.e., antihelminthics).

== Lifecycle ==
The eggs of the tapeworm are shed by the definitive host in the feces, and these are then consumed by rodents where they pass through several stages of development and cause various forms of damage, eventually coming to reside primarily in the liver and abdominal cavity where each scolex will create a fluid-filled cyst. Here the parasite will wait for up to two months for the rodent to be eaten by a suitable definitive host. The definitive host must ingest the strobilocercus stage of the tapeworm in order to acquire the parasite and complete the lifecycle. The strobilocercus is a larval stage that has a terminal bladder and a rather long segmented body that is in crowned with the scolex that looks very similar to that found on the adult form. Once a cat ingests the strobilocercus, the posterior portion of the larva is in digested away and then the anterior portion begins to develop. Infection in the cat will develop and become obvious between 30 and 80 days after the cat has ingested the infected liver of a prey animal. Once the infection is established, it can last for between seven months and three years. A cat will produce between three and four motile segments per day either excreted in the feces or through direct migration, each containing between 500 and 12,000 eggs. Spontaneous worm destrobilization (the shedding of the entire portion of the body located behind the scolex and containing all of the strobila) may occur without any change in actual infection. Once shed, the proglotids are often very active and are capable of crawling considerable distances as they shed their eggs. Actual eggs are spheroid and are between 31 and 36 micrometers in diameter. Superinfection in cats is possible if they are fed young tapeworms in the presence of established mature ones.

== Diagnosis ==
Infection in cats is diagnosed by finding the distinctive segments in the feces or by finding the eggs upon fecal flotation. The small segments, that have exited through the anus, lying around where the animal has been, can be seen. To identify a segment, it can be crushed on a glass slide and examined for eggs.

== Treatment ==
Praziquantel (5 mg/kg body weight) and epsiprantel have both been shown to be efficacious in the treatment of Taenia taeniaeformis in cats. Similarly, febantel and fenbendazole are approved for the treatment of this parasite in most of the world. Mebendazole and nitroscanate are also products that have efficacy against taeniataeniaeformis in cats.
