= Oxantel =

Chemical compound

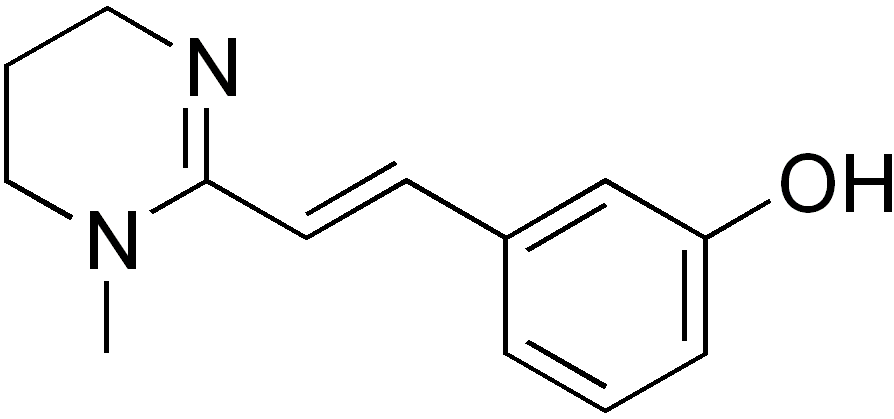

Clinical data
- ATC code: P02CC02 (WHO) QP52AF03 (WHO)

Identifiers
- IUPAC name: 3-[(E)-2-(1-Methyl-5,6-dihydro-4H-pyrimidin-2-yl)ethenyl]phenol
- CAS Number: 36531-26-7
- PubChem CID: 5281087
- ChemSpider: 4444540
- UNII: 94AJJ30D9E
- KEGG: D00806
- CompTox Dashboard (EPA): DTXSID601016597

Chemical and physical data
- Formula: C_{13}H_{16}N_{2}O
- Molar mass: 216.284 g·mol^{−1}
- 3D model (JSmol): Interactive image
- SMILES: CN1CCCN=C1/C=C/C2=CC(=CC=C2)O
- InChI: InChI=1S/C13H16N2O/c1-15-9-3-8-14-13(15)7-6-11-4-2-5-12(16)10-11/h2,4-7,10,16H,3,8-9H2,1H3/b7-6+; Key:VRYKTHBAWRESFI-VOTSOKGWSA-N

Oxantel is an anthelmintic. It has typically been used in human and animal medicine as a treatment for intestinal worms. It has also been shown to inhibit fumarate reductase in some pathogenic bacteria.

Similarly to pyrantel, oxantel depolarises the neurons of gastrointestinal parasites 100 times more than acetylcholine, causing sustained muscular contraction, causing the parasites to die by spastic paralysis. This anthelmintic is commonly used to treat domestic animals as well as livestock, and resistance has been reported in both groups of animals.
