= C16H12FN3O3 =

The molecular formula C_{16}H_{12}FN_{3}O_{3} (molar mass: 313.283 g/mol, exact mass: 313.0863 u) may refer to:

- Flubendazole
- Flunitrazepam
