= Oxibendazole =

Chemical compound

Clinical data
- AHFS/Drugs.com: International Drug Names
- ATCvet code: QP52AC07 (WHO)

Legal status
- Legal status: Veterinary use only

Identifiers
- IUPAC name: Methyl N-(6-propoxy-1H-benzimidazol-2-yl)carbamate
- CAS Number: 20559-55-1
- PubChem CID: 4622
- ChemSpider: 4461
- UNII: 022N12KJ0X
- KEGG: D05293
- CompTox Dashboard (EPA): DTXSID5045625
- ECHA InfoCard: 100.039.873

Chemical and physical data
- Formula: C_{12}H_{15}N_{3}O_{3}
- Molar mass: 249.270 g·mol^{−1}
- 3D model (JSmol): Interactive image
- SMILES: CCCOC1=CC2=C(C=C1)N=C(N2)NC(=O)OC
- InChI: InChI=1S/C12H15N3O3/c1-3-6-18-8-4-5-9-10(7-8)14-11(13-9)15-12(16)17-2/h4-5,7H,3,6H2,1-2H3,(H2,13,14,15,16); Key:RAOCRURYZCVHMG-UHFFFAOYSA-N

Oxibendazole is a benzimidazole drug that is used to protect against roundworms, strongyles, threadworms, pinworms and lungworm infestations in horses and some domestic pets. Like mebendazole, Oxibendazole inhibits tubulin polymerization. It is usually white to yellowish in appearance, and may take the form of a powder, tablet or paste.

== Synthesis ==
Oxibendazole synthesis:

4‑Hydroxyacetamide (1) is alkylated with n-propyl bromide in the presence of potassium hydroxide to give the ether (2). Nitration of this product with nitric and sulfuric acids proceeds at the position ortho to the amide group (3), which is then reduced with SnCl_{2} to yield the phenylenediamine derivative (4). Reaction of that intermediate with S-methyl isothiourea proceeds first by aromatic cyclisation to the guanidine derivative followed by elimination of methyl mercaptan to yield the 2-aminobenzimidazole system (5). Acylation with methyl chloroformate results in the formation of a urethane on the amino group to produce oxibendazole (6).
