= Bromofenofos =

Chemical compound

Clinical data
- Trade names: Acedist
- Other names: Bromfenofos; Bromophenophos; Bromphenophos; Bromophenfos
- ATCvet code: QP52AB02 (WHO)

Identifiers
- IUPAC name: 3,3',5,5'-Tetrabromo-2'-hydroxy-2-biphenylyl dihydrogen phosphate
- CAS Number: 21466-07-9
- PubChem CID: 30652
- ChemSpider: 28444
- UNII: XTH861Q3CR
- KEGG: C18392
- ChEBI: CHEBI:81726
- ChEMBL: ChEMBL532998
- CompTox Dashboard (EPA): DTXSID40175746
- ECHA InfoCard: 100.040.349

Chemical and physical data
- Formula: C_{12}H_{7}Br_{4}O_{5}P
- Molar mass: 581.773 g·mol^{−1}
- 3D model (JSmol): Interactive image
- SMILES: C1=C(C=C(C(=C1Br)O)C2=CC(=CC(=C2OP(=O)(O)O)Br)Br)Br
- InChI: InChI=1S/C12H7Br4O5P/c13-5-1-7(11(17)9(15)3-5)8-2-6(14)4-10(16)12(8)21-22(18,19)20/h1-4,17H,(H2,18,19,20); Key:MMYHZEDBTMXYAF-UHFFFAOYSA-N

Bromofenofos is an anthelminthic agent used in veterinary medicine. It is used to treat common liver fluke (Fasciola hepatica) infections in cattle and sheep.

It is teratogenic.
