= Nitroxinil =

Chemical compound

- Structure of nitroxinil

Clinical data
- Trade names: Fluconix, Dovenix, Trodax
- Other names: Nitroxynil
- Routes of administration: Subcutaneous in the form of an N-Ethylglucamine salt solution
- ATCvet code: QP52AG08 (WHO)

Identifiers
- IUPAC name: 4-Hydroxy-3-iodo-5-nitrobenzonitrile
- CAS Number: 1689-89-0
- PubChem CID: 15532
- UNII: 9L0EXQ7125
- CompTox Dashboard (EPA): DTXSID9075117
- ECHA InfoCard: 100.015.350

Chemical and physical data
- Formula: C_{7}H_{3}IN_{2}O_{3}
- Molar mass: 290.016 g·mol^{−1}
- 3D model (JSmol): Interactive image
- Melting point: 136–139 °C (277–282 °F)
- SMILES: C1=C(C=C(C(=C1[N+](=O)[O-])O)I)C#N
- InChI: InChI=1S/C7H3IN2O3/c8-5-1-4(3-9)2-6(7(5)11)10(12)13/h1-2,11H

Nitroxinil is an anthelmintic, a veterinary medicine against parasitic worms in sheep and cattle. The substance is active against the liver fluke the Fasciola hepatica and to a lesser extent against thread worms in the gastrointestinal tract. Brand names include Fluconix, Dovenix and Trodax. Nitroxynil is also used against strains of the red gum worm (Haemonchus contortus) that have become resistant to benzimidazoles.

Nitroxinil was invented by May & Baker in the mid 1960s as part of a program into investigation of derivatives of p-hydroxybenzonitrile. In addition to nitroxynil, the herbicides ioxynil (3,5-diiodo) and bromoxynil (3,5-dibromo) were also invented by the same company. Nitroxynil has a nitro group in addition to a single iodine group.

Nitroxynil is almost insoluble in water. It is usually injected subcutaneously into the animals in the form of the water-soluble ethylglucamine salt. It must not be administered to animals that produce milk for human consumption.
