= Monepantel =

Antiparasitic drug for sheep and cattle

Names
- IUPAC name N-{(2S)-2-cyano-1-[5-cyano-2-(trifluoromethyl)phenoxy]propan-2-yl}-4-(trifluoromethylsulfanyl)benzamide

Identifiers
CAS Number	887148-69-8
3D model (JSmol)	Interactive image
ChEBI	CHEBI:78621
ChEMBL	ChEMBL256563
ChemSpider	23315674
EC Number	639-775-0
PubChem CID	44449087
UNII	82MA79VJ33
CompTox Dashboard (EPA)	DTXSID001008318
- InChI: InChI=1S/C20H13F6N3O2S/c1-18(10-28,11-31-16-8-12(9-27)2-7-15(16)19(21,22)23)29-17(30)13-3-5-14(6-4-13)32-20(24,25)26/h2-8H,11H2,1H3,(H,29,30)/t18-/m0/s1 Key: WTERNLDOAPYGJD-SFHVURJKSA-N
- SMILES: C[C@](C#N)(COc1cc(C#N)ccc1C(F)(F)F)NC(=O)c1ccc(SC(F)(F)F)cc1

Properties
Chemical formula	C_{20}H_{13}F_{6}N_{3}O_{2}S
Molar mass	473.39 g·mol^{−1}

Pharmacology
ATCvet code	QP52AX09 (WHO)
Legal status	EU: Rx-only
- Except where otherwise noted, data are given for materials in their standard state (at 25 °C [77 °F], 100 kPa). Infobox references

Monepantel is an anthelmintic approved for use in sheep and cattle to control gastrointestinal nematodes. It belongs to a new class of anthelmintics called aminoacetonitrile derivatives (AAD). It is marketed by Elanco as Zolvix (United Kingdom) as a single active, or Zolvix Plus (New Zealand, Australia) in combination with the macrocyclic lactone abamectin.

== History ==
Aminoacetonitrile derivatives were originally discovered by scientists working at Novartis to have high potency against in vitro parasite models. Compounds were further validated in rodent parasite models following oral and subcutaneous administration. A lead compound AAD 1566 was isolated that eliminated pathogenic nematodes at doses of 2.5 mg/kg in sheep and 5.0 mg/kg in cattle and was named monepantel. The structure and anthelmintic activity of monepantel were first described in patent WO2005/44784.

It was first registered in 2009 for use in sheep in New Zealand to control adult and immature L4 stages of all major GI nematodes.

== Mechanism of action ==
Studies using a molecular genetic approach in C. elegans indicated that AADs worked via ligand-gated ion channels. Further research identified the DEG-3 subfamily of nicotinic acetylcholine receptors as the likely putative target of monepantel. Rufener et al published in 2009 that MPTL-1 was the likely binding site of monepantel in Haemonchus contortus. The DEG-3 subfamily is absent in mammals and this might explain the minimal toxicity of monepantel. It has been shown the AADs and monepantel in particular potentiate DEG-3/Des-2 receptors of H. contortus acting as an agonist of the nicotinic acetylcholine receptor producing spastic paralysis and death of the nematode. Interestingly, only the (S)-enantiomer was found to be active against gastrointestinal nematodes.

== Pharmacology ==
After administration to either sheep or cattle, monepantel is rapidly converted to its major metabolite monepantel sulfone, which also has similar levels of efficacy against gastrointestinal nematodes compared to the parent compound.

=== Sheep ===
Data on the pharmacokinetics of monepantel in sheep following intravenous and oral dosing have been published. The sulfone metabolite was rapidly formed and predominated after four hours regardless of the route of administration. Following oral dosing of sheep with 3 mg/kg of monepantel the Tmax, Cmax and AUC of monepantel were 16 h, 17.9 ng/mL and 671 ng.h/mL, while for the sulfone metabolite they were 24 h, 94.3 ng/mL and 11125 ng.h/mL.

=== Cattle ===
After oral treatment of dairy cattle, monepantel and monepantel sulfone are found in the plasma and milk. Monepantel is rapidly converted to the major metabolite monepantel sulfone which is then found in much higher concentration and lasts much longer in tissues than the parent compound. In one study in calves dosed orally with 2.5 mg/kg of monepantel the Tmax was 8 hours, Cmax 21.5 ng/mL and AUC 2174 ng.h/mL, while the major metabolite monepantel sulfone had a Tmax of 41.3 hours, Cmax of 96.8 ng/mL and AUC of 10242 ng.h.mL. In dairy cows given monepantel orally the major metabolite observed in plasma and milk was monepantel sulfone. Monepantel was detected for up to 33 hours in milk and the sulfone metabolite up to 177 hours. The milk concentrations of the sulfone metabolite were substantially higher than the plasma with the AUC being nearly 7 fold higher in milk than plasma. There was no significant change in the pharmacokinetics with the addition of oxfendazole.

== Efficacy ==
As an oral drench dosed at 2.5 mg/kg in sheep, monepantel has claimed efficacy against adult and immature L4 stages of all major GI nematodes, namely: Haemonchus contortus, Teladorsagia circumcincta, Teladorsagia trifurcata, Trichostrongylus axei, Trichostrongylus colubriformis, Trichostrongylus rugatus, Trichostrongylus vitrinus, Nematodirus, battus, Nematodirus filicollis, Nematodirus spathiger (adult stage only), Nematodirus abnormalis (only adult stage tested), Cooperia curticei, Cooperia oncophora, Oesophagostomum venulosum (L4 stage only) Chabertia ovina

== Safety ==
In sheep, monepantel is considered to have a good safety profile. Weaned lambs treated with 1x, 3x and 5x doses every 21 days for 8 occasions were found to be unaffected with no adverse events noted. Between control lambs and treated lambs there were no significant differences in body weight, organ weight, blood chemistry and haematology and coagulation detected.

== Anthelmintic resistance ==
Due to having a different mode of action and molecular target than other anthelmintics, monepantel will generally kill nematodes resistant to the other major classes of anthelmintics. However, within a few years of monepantel's release on the market, anthelmintic resistance was reported in several countries including Australia, New Zealand, Uruguay, Brazil, the Netherlands and the United Kingdom. These reports have shown a number of species were resistant to monepantel, including Haemonchus contortus, Teladorsagia circumcincta, Trichostrongylus colubriformis, and Oesophagostomum.
