= Haloxon =

Chemical compound

Clinical data
- Trade names: Halox
- ATCvet code: QP52AB04 (WHO)

Identifiers
- IUPAC name: Bis(2-chloroethyl) (3-chloro-4-methyl-2-oxochromen-7-yl) phosphate
- CAS Number: 321-55-1
- PubChem CID: 9454
- DrugBank: DB11419
- ChemSpider: 9082
- UNII: T8KXA37068
- ChEMBL: ChEMBL1897362
- CompTox Dashboard (EPA): DTXSID5046221
- ECHA InfoCard: 100.005.719

Chemical and physical data
- Formula: C_{14}H_{14}Cl_{3}O_{6}P
- Molar mass: 415.58 g·mol^{−1}
- 3D model (JSmol): Interactive image
- SMILES: CC1=C(Cl)C(=O)Oc2cc(OP(=O)(OCCCl)OCCCl)ccc12
- InChI: InChI=1S/C14H14Cl3O6P/c1-9-11-3-2-10(8-12(11)22-14(18)13(9)17)23-24(19,20-6-4-15)21-7-5-16/h2-3,8H,4-7H2,1H3; Key:KULDXINYXFTXMO-UHFFFAOYSA-N

Haloxon is an anthelminthic agent used in veterinary medicine to treat infection in cattle.
