= Nitroscanate =

Chemical compound

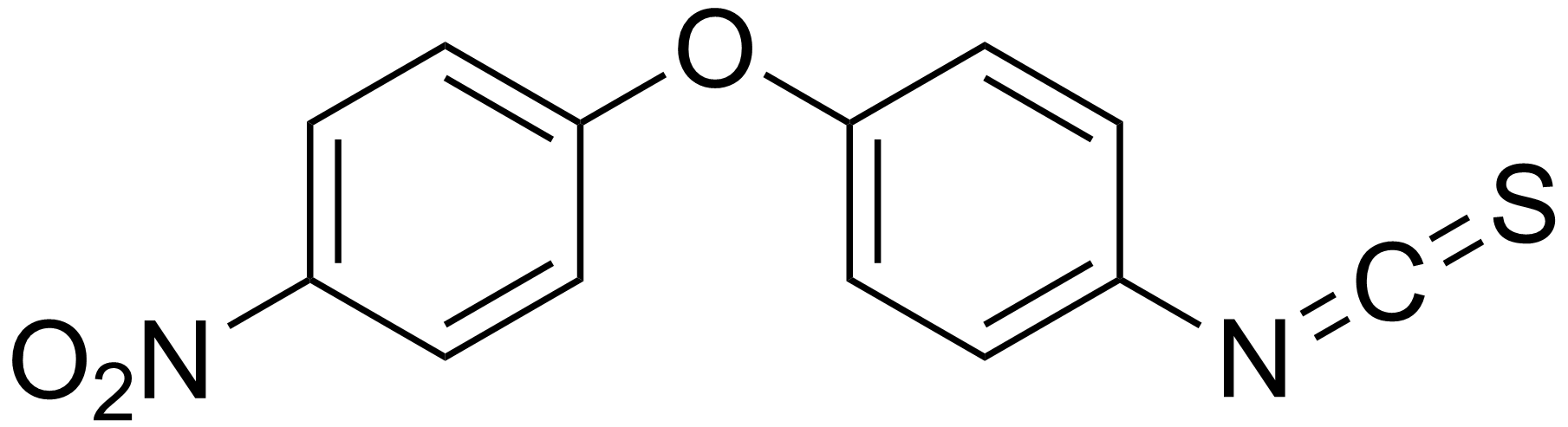

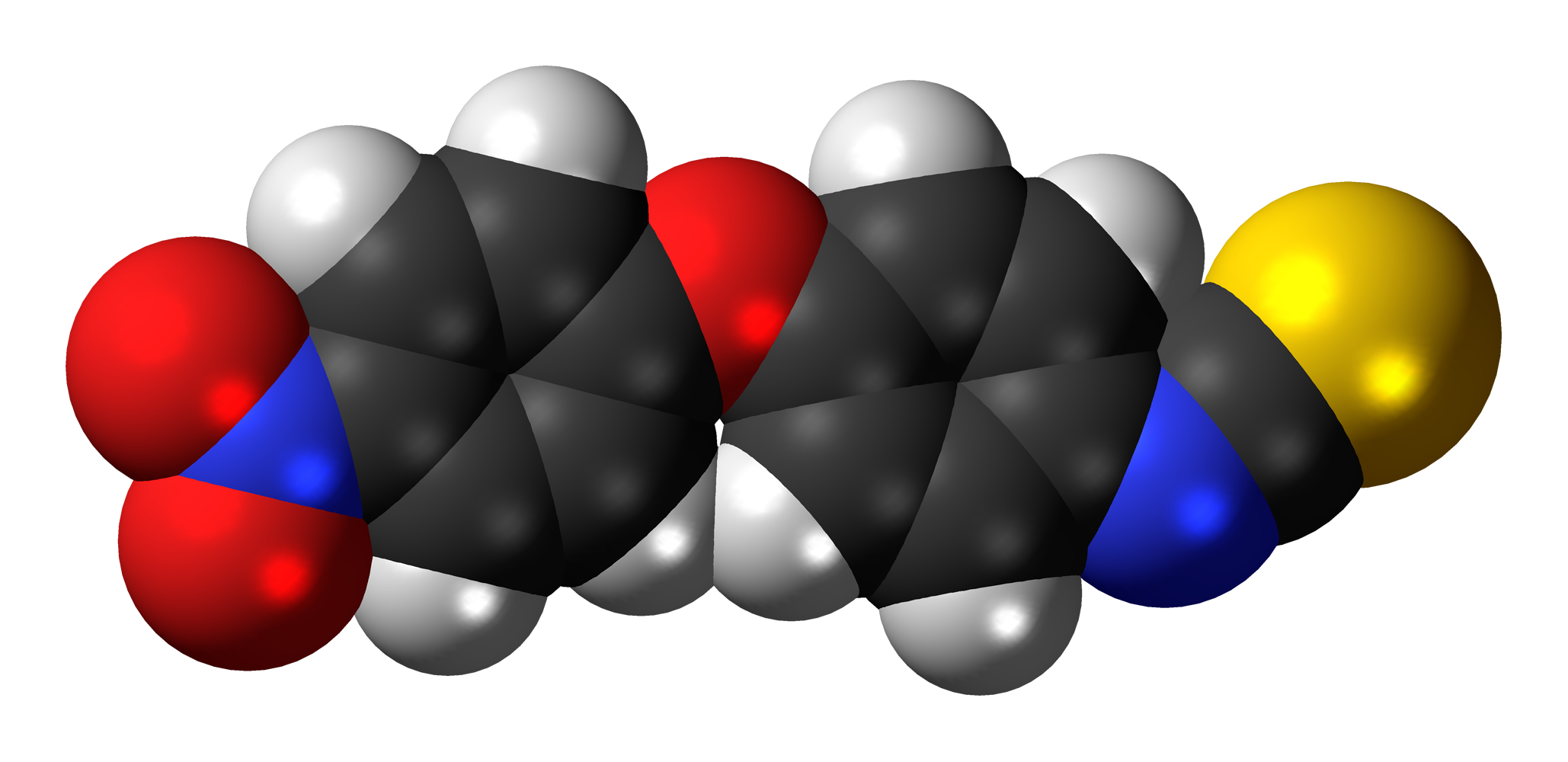

Clinical data
- Trade names: Lopatol
- AHFS/Drugs.com: International Drug Names
- ATCvet code: QP52AX01 (WHO)

Identifiers
- IUPAC name: 1-(4-Isothiocyanatophenoxy)-4-nitrobenzene
- CAS Number: 19881-18-6
- ChemSpider: 61821
- UNII: P4IE5B6D6U
- KEGG: D05193
- CompTox Dashboard (EPA): DTXSID9048772
- ECHA InfoCard: 100.039.433

Chemical and physical data
- Formula: C_{13}H_{8}N_{2}O_{3}S
- Molar mass: 272.28 g·mol^{−1}
- 3D model (JSmol): Interactive image
- SMILES: C1=CC(=CC=C1N=C=S)OC2=CC=C(C=C2)[N+](=O)[O-]
- InChI: InChI=1S/C13H8N2O3S/c16-15(17)11-3-7-13(8-4-11)18-12-5-1-10(2-6-12)14-9-19/h1-8H; Key:SVMGVZLUIWGYPH-UHFFFAOYSA-N

Nitroscanate (trade name Lopatol) is an anthelmintic drug used in veterinary medicine to treat Toxocara canis, Toxascaris leonina, Ancylostoma caninum, Uncinaria stenocephala, Taenia, and Dipylidium caninum (roundworms, hookworms and tapeworms).
