= Praziquantel =

Anti-parasite medication

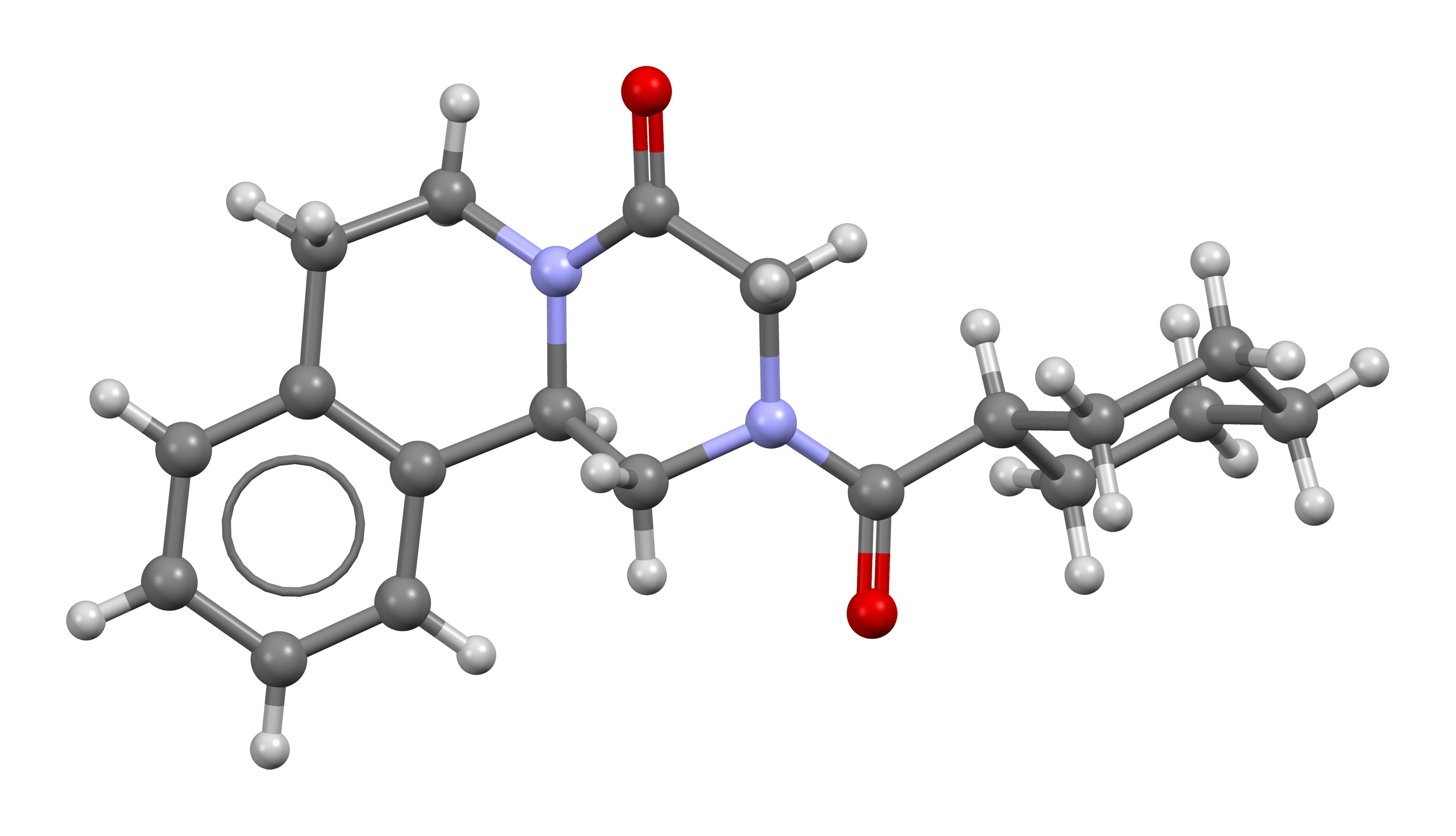

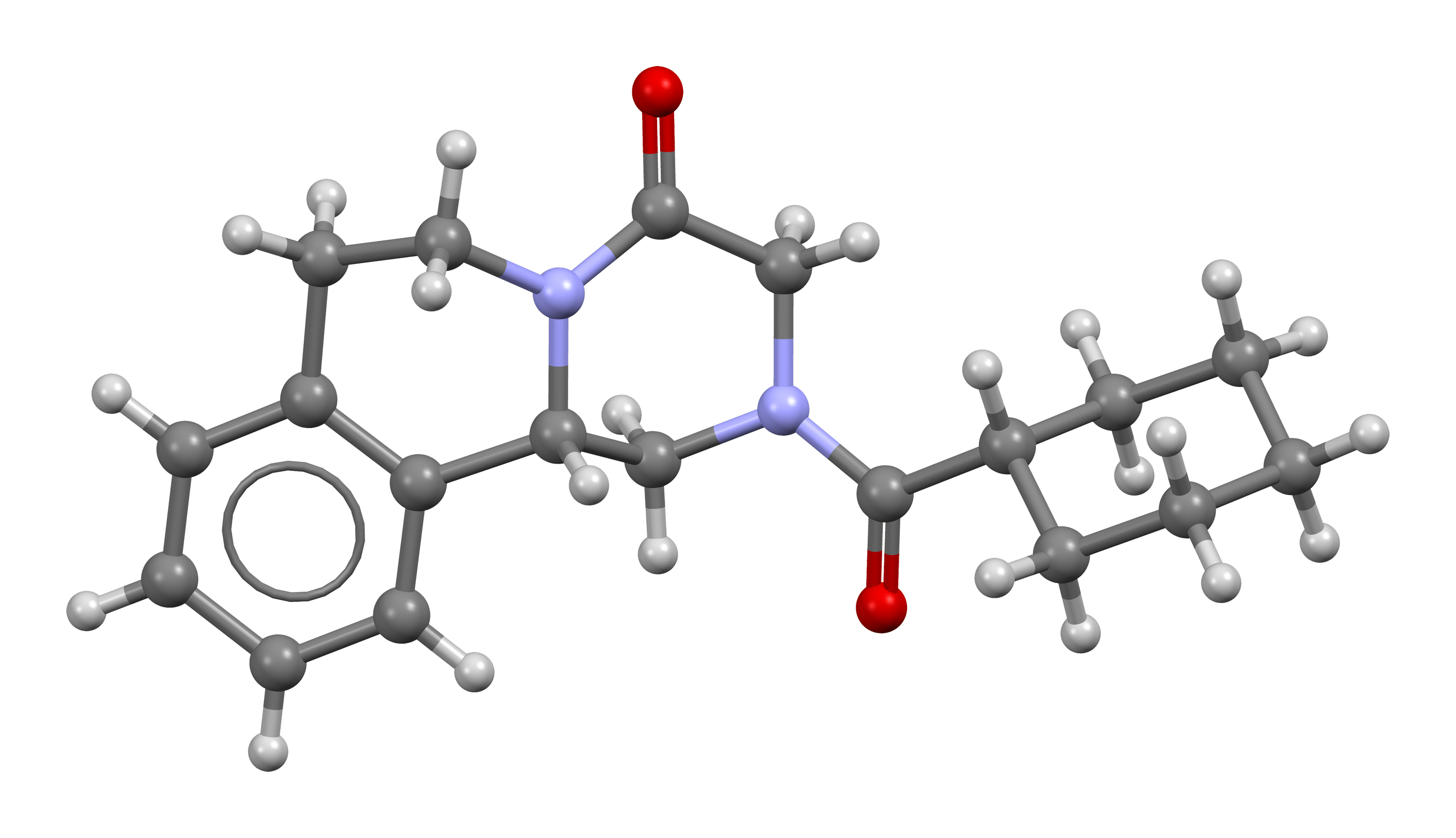

Clinical data
- Pronunciation: /ˌpræzɪˈkwɒntɛl/
- Trade names: Biltricide
- Other names: PZQ
- AHFS/Drugs.com: Monograph
- MedlinePlus: a608048
- License data: US DailyMed: Praziquantel
- Pregnancy category: AU: B1
- Routes of administration: by mouth
- ATC code: P02BA01 (WHO) QP52AA01 (WHO) QP52AA51 (WHO)

Legal status
- Legal status: CA: ℞-only; US: ℞-only (human use), OTC (veterinary use); EU: Rx-only

Pharmacokinetic data
- Bioavailability: Relatively small
- Metabolism: Liver
- Elimination half-life: 0.8–1.5 hours (main metabolites: 4–5 hours)
- Excretion: Kidney (mainly)

Identifiers
- IUPAC name: (RS)-2-(Cyclohexylcarbonyl)-1,2,3,6,7,11b-hexahydro-4H-pyrazino[2,1-a]isoquinolin-4-one
- CAS Number: 55268-74-1
- PubChem CID: 4891
- DrugBank: DB01058
- ChemSpider: 4722
- UNII: 6490C9U457
- KEGG: D00471
- ChEMBL: ChEMBL976
- CompTox Dashboard (EPA): DTXSID9021182
- ECHA InfoCard: 100.054.126

Chemical and physical data
- Formula: C_{19}H_{24}N_{2}O_{2}
- Molar mass: 312.413 g·mol^{−1}
- 3D model (JSmol): Interactive image
- Melting point: 136 to 138 °C (277 to 280 °F)
- SMILES: O=C4N2C(c1c(cccc1)CC2)CN(C(=O)C3CCCCC3)C4
- InChI: InChI=1S/C19H24N2O2/c22-18-13-20(19(23)15-7-2-1-3-8-15)12-17-16-9-5-4-6-14(16)10-11-21(17)18/h4-6,9,15,17H,1-3,7-8,10-13H2; Key:FSVJFNAIGNNGKK-UHFFFAOYSA-N

Praziquantel, sold under the brandname Biltricide among others, is a medication used to treat a number of types of parasitic worm infections in mammals, birds, amphibians, reptiles, and fish. In humans specifically, it is used to treat schistosomiasis, clonorchiasis, opisthorchiasis, tapeworm infections, cysticercosis, echinococcosis, paragonimiasis, fasciolopsiasis, and fasciolosis. It should not be used for worm infections of the eye. It is taken by mouth.

Side effects in humans may include poor coordination, abdominal pain, vomiting, headache, and allergic reactions. While it may be used during pregnancy, it is not recommended for use during breastfeeding. Praziquantel is in the anthelmintic class of medications. It works partly by affecting the function of the worm's sucker.

Praziquantel was approved for medical use in the United States in 1982, and for veterinary use in the European Union in April 2025. It is on the World Health Organization's List of Essential Medicines.

== Medical uses ==
Praziquantel is used to treat diseases caused by infection with several types of internal/gastrointestinal, and external parasites, including:

- Schistosomiasis caused by trematodes of the genus Schistosoma: As of 2005, praziquantel is the primary treatment for human schistosomiasis, for which it is usually effective in a single dose
- Hydatid disease caused by infection of various organs with larval stages of tapeworms of the genus Echinococcus
- Cysticercosis caused by infection of the brain and/or muscles with the eggs and larvae of the pork tapeworm Taenia solium (though it has been judged less effective than albendazole in treatment of neurocysticercosis)
- Taeniasis caused by intestinal infection with Taenia saginata and Taenia solium
- Diphyllobothriasis caused by intestinal infection with Diphyllobothrium latum
- Hymenolepiasis caused by Hymenolepis nana and Hymenolepis diminuta
- Bertielliasis caused by intestinal infection with Bertiella studeri
- In dogs and cats, whose gastrointestinal tracts are infected with the tapeworms Dipylidium caninum or Taenia taeniaeformis, respectively; praziquantel is also often used in fixed combination with pyrantel embonate against the roundworms (ascarids): Toxocara cati and Toxascaris leonina. Praziquantel is also effective against Echinococcus multilocularis.
- Clonorchiasis brought on by the Chinese liver fluke Clonorchis sinensis
- Opisthorchiasis brought on by the liver flukes Opisthorchis viverrini and Opisthorchis felineus
- Paragonimiasis caused by infection with lung flukes, mostly of the species Paragonimus westermani
- Fasciolopsiasis caused by the giant intestinal fluke Fasciolopsis buski
- Echinostomiasis caused by infection with intestinal flukes of the genus Echinostoma
- Metagonimiasis caused by infection with intestinal flukes of the genus Metagonimus
- Heterophyiasis caused by the intestinal fluke Heterophyes heterophyes
- Gastrodiscoidiasis caused by the intestinal fluke Gastrodiscoides hominis

== Side effects ==
The majority of side effects develop due to the release of the contents of the parasites as they are killed and the consequent host immune reaction. The heavier the parasite burden, the heavier and more frequent the side effects normally are.

- Central nervous system (CNS): Frequently occurring side effects are dizziness, headache, and malaise. Drowsiness, somnolence, fatigue, and vertigo have also been seen. Almost all patients with cerebral cysticercosis experience CNS side effects related to the cell-death of the parasites (headache, worsening of pre-existing neurological problems, seizures, arachnoiditis, and meningism). These side effects may be life-threatening and can be reduced by coadministration of corticosteroids. All patients with cerebral cysticercosis are strongly recommended to be hospitalized during treatment.
- Gastrointestinal tract: About 90% of all patients have abdominal pain or cramps with or without nausea and vomiting. Diarrhea may develop and may be severe with colic. Sweating, fever, and sometimes bloody stools may occur together with diarrhea. Praziquantel also has a bitter taste that can result in gagging or vomiting.
- Liver: Asymptomatic and transient increases of liver enzymes (AST and ALT) are noted frequently (up to 27%). No case of symptomatic liver damage has been seen so far.
- Sensitivity reactions: Urticaria, rash, pruritus and eosinophilia in white blood cell counts
- Other locations/body as a whole: Lower back pain, myalgia, arthralgia, fever, sweating, various cardiac arrhythmias, and hypotension

=== Pregnancy ===
The WHO states praziquantel is safe during pregnancy (although does not recommend use during the first trimester). Animal studies have failed to reveal evidence of fetal harm. Praziquantel is effective in reducing schistosomiasis during pregnancy. Another trial found that treatment with praziquantel did not increase the rates of low birthweight, fetal death, or congenital anomalies.

== Drug interactions ==
Co-administration of drugs that inhibit the activity of drug metabolizing liver enzymes such as (CYP450), e.g., cimetidine, ketoconazole, itraconazole, erythromycin, and ritonavir, may increase plasma concentrations of praziquantel.

The antibiotic rifampicin, a strong CYP450 inducer, decreases plasma concentrations of praziquantel.

Carbamazepine and phenytoin are reported to reduce the bioavailability of praziquantel. Chloroquine also reduces its bioavailability.

== Mechanism of action ==
Experimental evidence indicates praziquantel increases the permeability of the membranes of schistosome cells towards calcium ions. The drug thereby induces contraction of the parasites' muscle, resulting in paralysis in the contracted state. Another early effect of praziquantel on schistosomes is morphological disruption of the tegumental surface of the worm, exposing parasite antigens to the host immune system, and likely rendering the parasite more susceptible to host immune attack. The dying parasites are dislodged from their site of action in the host organism and may enter systemic circulation or may be destroyed by host immune reaction (phagocytosis). Additional mechanisms including focal disintegrations and disturbances of oviposition (laying of eggs) are seen in other types of sensitive parasites.

Praziquantel is administered as a racemate; the (R)-enantiomer has greater antiparasitic activity than the (S)-enantiomer, both in vitro and in vivo; the enantiomers may be separated using a resolution of an amine obtained from praziquantel, as well as by other methods.

Praziquantel is not effective against juvenile (3-4 week post-infection) mammalian-stage schistosomes, a property that has implications for efficacy and timing of drug treatment.

The primary molecular target of the drug appears to be TRPM_{PZQ}, a Ca^{2+}-permeable transient receptor potential (TRP) ion channel that is found in schistosomes and other praziquantel-sensitive platyhelminths. TRPM_{PZQ} is a voltage-independent channel that is a member of the TRPM family of the TRP ion channel superfamily. The active (R)-enantiomer of praziquantel activates Schistosoma mansoni TRPM_{PZQ} with an EC_{50} of 597 nM (154 nM at 37°C); the EC_{50} for the less biologically active (S)-enantiomer is 27.9 μM. TRPM_{PZQ} is also found in the praziquantel-insensitive liver fluke, Fasciola hepatica, but exhibits a critical amino acid change in the praziquantel binding pocket from asparagine to threonine, resulting in insensitivity to activation of the channel by praziquantel. Schistosomes selected for diminished sensitivity to praziquantel exhibit reduced levels of TRPM_{PZQ} expression. The physiological role of TRPM_{PZQ} in the parasite is currently unknown.

Interestingly, the inactive (S)-enantiomer of praziquantel activates a human TRPM8 channel, and it has been suggested that this interaction may enhance a praziquantel-induced elimination of schistosomes by increasing vascular contraction in host mesenteric vessels, where parasites may reside (the interaction with TRPM8 may as well be responsible for the unpleasant taste of the drug).

Although TRPM_{PZQ} appears to be the primary target of praziquantel, it is clear that praziquantel also interacts with other targets. These include a platyhelminth-specific voltage-gated calcium channel β subunit that, when paired with an α_{1} subunit, results in activation of the expressed channel by 100 nM praziquantel. Interestingly, praziquantel also disrupts the polarity of regeneration in free-living planarians (eg, Dugesia), an effect dependent on the expression of neuronal voltage-operated calcium channel isoforms.

Praziquantel is also an inhibitor of, and a likely substrate for, a schistosome P-glycoprotein-like multidrug resistance transporter. Increased expression of this or another schistosome multidrug resistance transporter correlates with reduced sensitivity to praziquantel, while inhibition or knockdown of expression of these proteins increases worm responsiveness to praziquantel.

Another hypothesis for praziquantel mode of action is that it interferes with adenosine uptake in schistosomes. This effect may have therapeutic relevance given that schistosomes, as well as Taenia and the Echinococcus (other praziquantel-sensitive parasites), are unable to synthesize purines, such as adenosine, de novo.

Bayer's Animal Health Division website states, "Praziquantel is active against cestodes (tapeworms). Praziquantel is absorbed, metabolized in the liver, and excreted in the bile. Upon entering the digestive tract from the bile, cestocidal activity is exhibited. Following exposure to praziquantel, the tapeworm loses its ability to resist digestion by the mammalian host. Because of this, whole tapeworms, including the scolices (plural of "scolex"), are very rarely passed after administration of praziquantel. In many instances, only disintegrated and partially digested pieces of tapeworms will be seen in the stool. The majority of tapeworms are digested and are not found in the feces."

== Pharmacokinetics ==
Praziquantel is well absorbed (about 80%) from the gastrointestinal tract. However, due to extensive first-pass metabolism, only a relatively small amount enters systemic circulation. Praziquantel has a serum half-life of 0.8 to 1.5 hours in adults with normal renal and liver function. Metabolites have a half-life of 4 to 5 hours. In patients with significantly impaired liver function (Child-Pugh score B and C), the serum half-life is increased to 3 to 8 hours. Praziquantel and its metabolites are mainly excreted renally; within 24 h after a single oral dose, 70 to 80% is found in urine, but less than 0.1% as the unchanged drug. Praziquantel is metabolized through the cytochrome P450 pathway via CYP3A4. Agents that induce or inhibit CYP3A4 such as phenytoin, rifampin, and azole antifungals will affect the metabolism of praziquantel.

Praziquantel has a particularly dramatic effect on patients with schistosomiasis. Studies of those treated have shown that within six months of receiving a dose of praziquantel, up to 90% of the damage done to internal organs due to schistosomiasis infection can be reversed.

== History ==
Praziquantel was developed in the laboratories for parasitological research of Bayer AG and Merck KGaA in Germany (Elberfeld and Darmstadt) in the mid-1970s.

== Society and culture ==
=== Brand names ===
- Biltricide (Bayer) Tablets (for human use)
- Cesol (Merck) Tablets
- Cestoved (Vedco) both tablets and injectable for veterinary use
- Cysticide (Merck) Tablets
- Distocide (Shin Poong Pharm. Co., Ltd.) tablet (for human use)
- Distoside (Chandra Bhagat Pharma Pvt Ltd) tablet (for human use)
- Droncit (Bayer) for veterinary use
- Drontal (combination with pyrantel pamoate) (Bayer) for veterinary use
- D-Worm (Farnum) for veterinary use; note that D-Worm also makes roundworm medicine containing piperidine which is not effective against tapeworms.
- Fish Tapes (Thomas Labs) for aquarium use
- Interceptor Plus chewable tablets (combination with milbemycin) (Elanco) for veterinary use. Note regular Interceptor only has milbemycin and does not contain praziquantel.
- Kaicide (Taiwan)
- Milbemax (combination with milbemycin oxime) (Novartis) for veterinary use
- Popantel (Jurox)
- PraziPro (Hikari) for aquarium use
- Praz-Tastic (NFP/National Fish Pharmaceuticals) for aquarium use
- Pure Prazi (COTS Koi/Children of the Sun Koi) for aquarium use
- PraziPure (J.K.O., Inc. d/b/a Kodama Koi Farm & Kodama Koi Garden; licensed by COTS Koi) for aquarium use
- Profender (combination with emodepside) (Bayer) for veterinary use
- Tape Worm Tabs (Trade Winds) for veterinary use
- Zentozide (Berich (Thailand) Co)

=== Regulatory approval ===
Praziquantel is on the World Health Organization's List of Essential Medicines.

Praziquantel is not licensed for use in humans in the UK, but it can be imported when necessary on a named-patient basis. It is available in the UK as a veterinary anthelmintic.

Praziquantel is approved in the US for the treatment of schistosomiasis and liver flukes, although it is effective in other infections.

== Veterinary medicine ==
- Salmon poisoning disease
- Diplozoon paradoxum and other Trematoda infections of many fish species

In March 2025, the Committee for Veterinary Medicinal Products of the European Medicines Agency adopted a positive opinion, recommending the granting of a marketing authorization for the veterinary medicinal product 'Prazivetin premix for medicated feeding stuff' intended for sea bream. The applicant for this veterinary medicinal product is Vethellas S.A. The main benefit of Prazivetin is its efficacy against infestations of the gills caused by the monogenean Sparicotyle chrysophrii. Praziquantel was authorized for veterinary use in the European Union in April 2025.
