= Flubendazole =

Chemical compound

Clinical data
- AHFS/Drugs.com: International Drug Names
- License data: US DailyMed: Flubendazole
- ATC code: P02CA05 (WHO) QP52AC12 (WHO)

Identifiers
- IUPAC name: Methyl N-[6-(4-fluorobenzoyl)-1H-benzimidazol-2-yl]carbamate
- CAS Number: 31430-15-6
- PubChem CID: 35802
- DrugBank: DB08974
- ChemSpider: 32932
- UNII: R8M46911LR
- KEGG: D04200
- ChEBI: CHEBI:77095
- ChEMBL: ChEMBL145946
- CompTox Dashboard (EPA): DTXSID8023058
- ECHA InfoCard: 100.046.007

Chemical and physical data
- Formula: C_{16}H_{12}FN_{3}O_{3}
- Molar mass: 313.288 g·mol^{−1}
- 3D model (JSmol): Interactive image
- Melting point: 243 °C (469 °F)
- Solubility in water: 10.0 ± 0.4 × 10^{−6} μg/mL (pH 1.6); 0.29 ± 0.06 × 10^{−6} μg/mL (pH 6.5) mg/mL (20 °C)
- SMILES: COC(=O)Nc1[nH]c2ccc(cc2n1)C(=O)c3ccc(cc3)F
- InChI: InChI=1S/C16H12FN3O3/c1-23-16(22)20-15-18-12-7-4-10(8-13(12)19-15)14(21)9-2-5-11(17)6-3-9/h2-8H,1H3,(H2,18,19,20,22); Key:CPEUVMUXAHMANV-UHFFFAOYSA-N

Flubendazole is an anthelmintic, used both in humans and for veterinarian purposes. It is very close chemically to mebendazole, the only difference being an added fluorine atom. Like mebendazole, flubendazole inhibits tubulin polymerization.

== Human use ==
It is available for human use to treat worm infections. In certain countries such as France, it is inexpensive and available OTC (without prescription) under the brand name Fluvermal as an alternative to mebendazole which is not currently sold there.

== Veterinarian use ==
Under veterinary use, its brand name is Flutelmium which is a paste manufactured by Janssen Pharmaceutica N.V. used by veterinarians for protection against internal parasites and worms in dogs and cats. Other brand names are Flubenol, Biovermin, and Flumoxal.

Since 2000, Flubendazole-treated grit has increasingly been laid out on a landscape-scale across many UK grouse-shooting moors by gamekeepers in an attempt to reduce the impact on bird numbers from strongyle worm. Evidence of high worm burden is required before a veterinarian can dispense and sell the product, known as 'medicated grit'. However, there has been increasing concern about contaminants entering the ground waters running off from moorlands, as well as from its use in farming environments and its presence in manure. Researchers are starting to gather research evidence in order to inform policy development on the presence of this and other veterinary medicines in the wider environment.
