= Emodepside =

Chemical compound

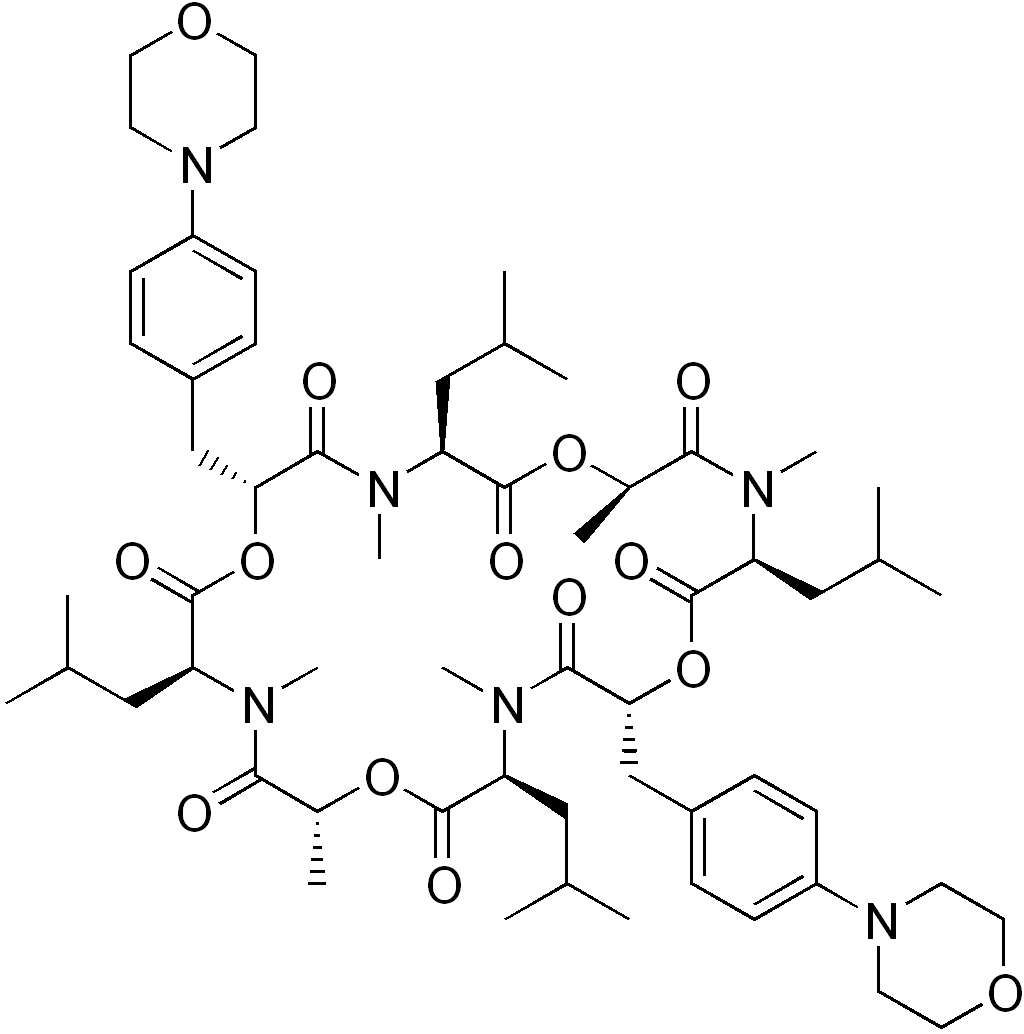

Clinical data
- Trade names: Profender (combination with praziquantel)
- AHFS/Drugs.com: International Drug Names
- ATCvet code: QP52AX60 (WHO) (combination with toltrazuril)

Legal status
- Legal status: CA: ℞-only

Identifiers
- CAS Number: 155030-63-0
- PubChem CID: 6918632
- ChemSpider: 5293825
- UNII: YZ647Y5GC9
- ChEBI: CHEBI:78739
- ChEMBL: ChEMBL2104404
- CompTox Dashboard (EPA): DTXSID50165799
- ECHA InfoCard: 100.123.218

Chemical and physical data
- Formula: C_{60}H_{90}N_{6}O_{14}
- Molar mass: 1119.408 g·mol^{−1}
- 3D model (JSmol): Interactive image
- SMILES: CC(C)C[C@H]1C(=O)O[C@H](Cc2ccc(N3CCOCC3)cc2)C(=O)N(C)[C@@H](CC(C)C)C(=O)O[C@H](C)C(=O)N(C)[C@@H](CC(C)C)C(=O)O[C@H](Cc2ccc(N3CCOCC3)cc2)C(=O)N(C)[C@@H](CC(C)C)C(=O)O[C@H](C)C(=O)N1C
- InChI: InChI=1S/C60H90N6O14/c1-37(2)31-47-57(71)77-41(9)53(67)61(11)50(34-40(7)8)60(74)80-52(36-44-17-21-46(22-18-44)66-25-29-76-30-26-66)56(70)64(14)48(32-38(3)4)58(72)78-42(10)54(68)62(12)49(33-39(5)6)59(73)79-51(55(69)63(47)13)35-43-15-19-45(20-16-43)65-23-27-75-28-24-65/h15-22,37-42,47-52H,23-36H2,1-14H3/t41-,42-,47+,48+,49+,50+,51-,52-/m1/s1; Key:ZMQMTKVVAMWKNY-YSXLEBCMSA-N

Emodepside is an anthelmintic drug that is effective against a number of gastrointestinal nematodes, is licensed for use in cats and belongs to the class of drugs known as the octadepsipeptides, a relatively new class of anthelmintic (research into these compounds began in the early 1990s), which are suspected to achieve their anti-parasitic effect by a novel mechanism of action due to their ability to kill nematodes resistant to other anthelmintics.

== Synthesis ==
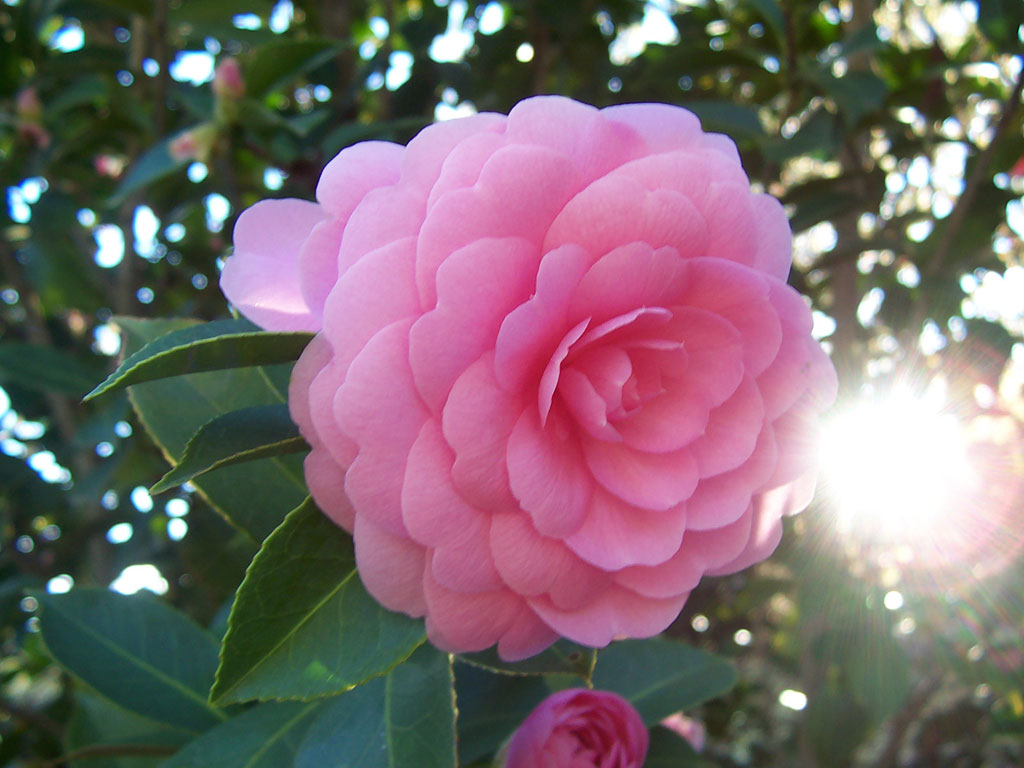
Camellia japonica, the host of the fungus that produces the precursor to emodepside

Emodepside is synthesised by attaching a morpholine ring at the para position of each of the two D-phenyllactic acid units in the fungal metabolite PF1022A, which is obtained from the fungus Mycelia sterile that inhabits the leaves of the flowering shrub, Camellia japonica.

== Anthelmintic effects ==
When applied to nematodes, emodepside has been shown to have a range of effects, inhibiting muscle in the parasitic nematode Ascaris suum, and inhibiting locomotive and pharyngeal movement in Caenorhabditis elegans in addition to having effects in other tissues such as the inhibition of egg laying.

== Mechanism of action ==
One of the ways in which emodepside achieves its effects has been shown to be through binding to a group of G-protein coupled receptors called latrophilins, first identified as being target proteins for α-latrotoxin (the other target protein of α-LTX being neurexin, a membrane receptor with laminin-like extracellular domains), a component of black widow spider venom that can cause paralysis and subsequent death in nematodes and humans alike. LAT-1 (1014 amino acids, 113 kDa coded by the B0457.1 gene) and LAT-2 (1338 amino acids, 147 kDa coded by the B0286.2 gene) are located presynaptically at the neuromuscular junction in Caenorhabditis elegans and share 21% amino acid identity with each other (the amino acid sequence homology LAT-1 shares with rat, bovine and human latrophilins has been shown to be 22, 23 and 21% respectively).

Hypothesized structure of the LAT-1 receptor. Ref: An original drawing by James Buckley based on information from.

Following receptor-ligand binding, a conformational change induced in the receptor activates the Gq protein, freeing the Gqα subunit from the βγ complex. The Gqα protein then goes on to couple-to and activate the signaling molecule phospholipase-C-β, a protein that has been identified as being key to the modulation of regulatory pathways of vesicle release in C. elegans.

In its signaling cascade, PLC-β (like other phospholipases) hydrolyses phosphatidylinositolbisphosphate to yield inositol trisphosphate (IP3) and diacylglycerol (DAG). As IP3 receptors have sparse or little distribution throughout the pharyngeal nervous system of C. elegans (one of the tissues where LAT-1 agonists such as α-LTX and emodepside have their most predominant effects) and β-phorbel esters (which mimic the effects of DAG) have been shown to have a stimulatory action on synaptic transmission, it has been concluded that it is the DAG component of the cascade that regulates neurotransmitter release.

Indeed, in C. elegans, DAG regulates UNC-13, a plasma-membrane associated protein critical for vesicle-mediated neurotransmitter release and mutational studies have shown that two UNC-13 reduction of function mutants show resistance to emodepside, observations supporting this hypothesized mechanism of action. The mechanism by which activation of UNC-13 results in neurotransmitter release (the ultimate result of latrophilin activation) is through interaction with the synaptosomal membrane protein syntaxin, with UNC-13 binding to the N-terminus of syntaxin and promoting the switch from the closed form of syntaxin (which is incompatible with SNARE complex synaptobrevin, SNAP-25 and syntaxin formation) to its open formation so that SNARE complex formation can be achieved, thereby allowing vesicle fusion and release to take place.

At a molecular level, the net result of the activation of this pathway, is the spontaneous stimulation of inhibitory PF1-like neuropeptide release (this is suspected due to Emodepside's inhibition of acetylcholine-elicited muscle contraction requiring both calcium ions and extracellular potassium ions, similar to the action of PF1/PF2). Although in experiments on synaptosomes, α-LTX triggered non-calcium dependent exocytosis of vesicles containing acetylcholine, glutamate and GABA, both glutamate and GABA have been ruled out as the sole neurotransmitters responsible for emodepside's action) which then acts on the post-synaptic membrane (i.e. the pharyngeal/muscle membrane) of the nematode, having an inhibitory effect thereby either inducing paralysis or inhibiting pharyngeal pumping, both of which ultimately result in the death of the organism.

Diagram

Mutational studies involving LAT-1 knockout and LAT-2 gene deletion mutants have revealed that the role of latrophilin receptors in the different tissues that they are expressed differs between subtypes, with LAT-1 being expressed in the pharynx of C. elegans (thereby modulating pharyngeal pumping) and LAT-2 having a role in locomotion.

In addition to exerting an effect on the nematode via binding to Latrophilin receptors, there is also recent evidence that indicates that emodepside also interacts with the BK potassium channel coded by the gene Slo-1. This protein is a member of the 6 transmembrane helix structural class of potassium ion channels with each subunit consisting of 6 transmembrane helices and 1 P domain (this P domain is conserved in all potassium ion channels and forms the selectivity filter that enables the channel to transport potassium ions across the membrane in great preference to other ions). These subunits group together to form high conductance BK-type channels that are gated by both membrane potential and intracellular calcium levels (this calcium ion sensing ability is accommodated by an intracellular tail region on Slo-like subunits that form a calcium ion binding motif consisting of a run of conserved aspartate residues, termed a “calcium bowl”), with their physiological role being to regulate the excitability of neurons and muscle fibres, through the way in which they participate in action potential repolarization (with potassium ion efflux being used to repolarize the cell following depolarization).

The presumable effect that emodepside interaction with these channels would exert on the neuron would be to activate the channel causing potassium ion efflux, hyper-polarization and subsequent inhibition of excitatory neurotransmitter effect (acetylcholine if acting at the neuromuscular junction), having an inhibitory effect on synaptic transmission, the production of postsynaptic action potentials and ultimately muscle contraction (manifesting itself as paralysis or reduced pharyngeal pumping).

Which out of latrophilin receptors and BK-potassium channels is emodepside's primary site of action remains to be completely deduced. Both LAT-1/LAT-2 and slo-1 mutants (reduction/loss of function) show significant resistance to emodepside with it being conceivable that the presence of both is required for emodepside to induce its full effect.

== Therapeutic use ==
The patent for emodepside is owned by Elanco (previously, Bayer HealthCare). Emodepside is sold in combination with praziquantel for topical application under the tradename Profender.
