= Imidazothiazoles =

Class of chemical compounds comprising a bicyclic heterocycle

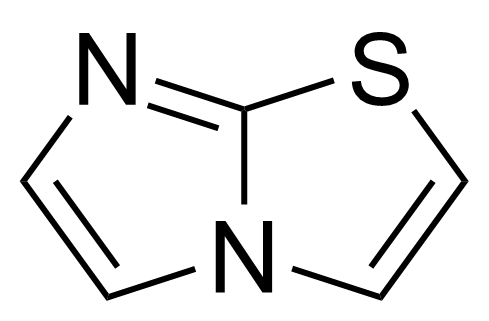
The general structure of imidazothiazoles.

Imidazothiazoles are a class of chemical compounds containing a bicyclic heterocycle (a double ring system) consisting of an imidazole ring fused to a thiazole ring. The structure contains three non-carbon or heteroatoms: two nitrogen atoms and one sulfur atom. Imidazothiazole derivatives show a broad spectrum of in vitro, i.e. "in the petri dish", activity such as anticancer, antipsychotic, antimicrobial, antifungal, and anthelmintic (against cancer, psychosis, microorganisms, fungi and worms, respectively).
