= Oxyclozanide =

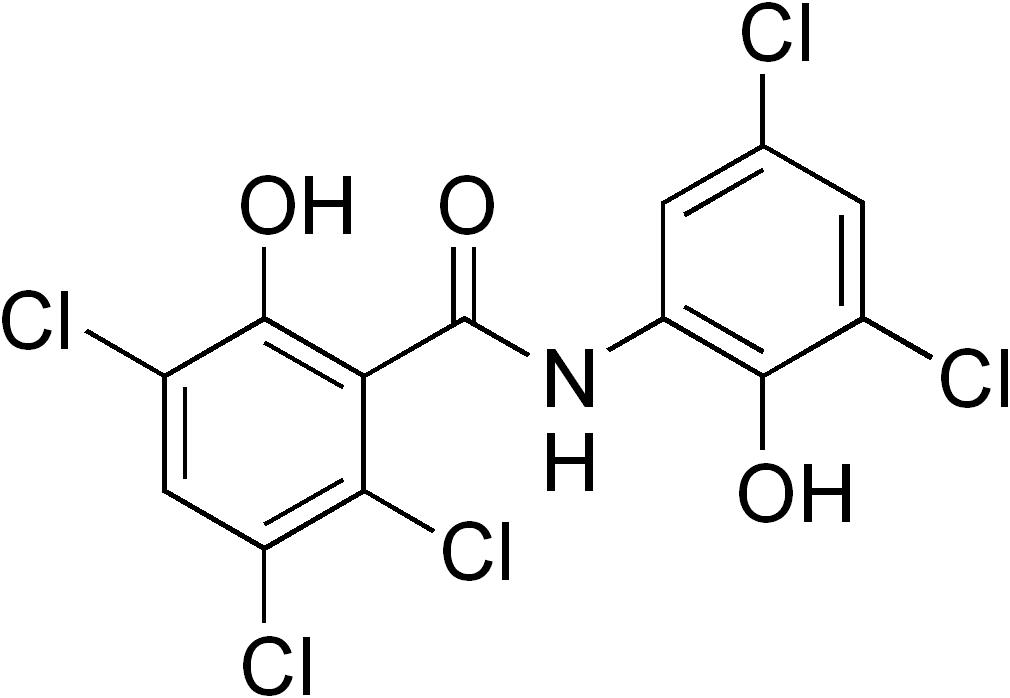

Names
- Preferred IUPAC name 2,3,5-Trichloro-N-(3,5-dichloro-2-hydroxyphenyl)-6-hydroxybenzamide

Identifiers
CAS Number	2277-92-1
3D model (JSmol)	Interactive image
ChemSpider	15904
ECHA InfoCard	100.017.186
KEGG	D08320
PubChem CID	16779
UNII	1QS9G4876X
CompTox Dashboard (EPA)	DTXSID50177312
- InChI: InChI=1S/C13H6Cl5NO3/c14-4-1-6(16)11(20)8(2-4)19-13(22)9-10(18)5(15)3-7(17)12(9)21/h1-3,20-21H,(H,19,22) Key: JYWIYHUXVMAGLG-UHFFFAOYSA-N; InChI=1/C13H6Cl5NO3/c14-4-1-6(16)11(20)8(2-4)19-13(22)9-10(18)5(15)3-7(17)12(9)21/h1-3,20-21H,(H,19,22) Key: JYWIYHUXVMAGLG-UHFFFAOYAW
- SMILES: C1=C(C=C(C(=C1Cl)O)NC(=O)C2=C(C(=CC(=C2Cl)Cl)Cl)O)Cl

Properties
Chemical formula	C_{13}H_{6}Cl_{5}NO_{3}
Molar mass	401.45 g·mol^{−1}

Pharmacology
ATCvet code	QP52AG06 (WHO)
- Except where otherwise noted, data are given for materials in their standard state (at 25 °C [77 °F], 100 kPa). verify (what is ?) Infobox references

Oxyclozanide (also known pentaclosamide) as is a salicylanilide anthelmintic. It is used in the treatment and control of fascioliasis in ruminants, mainly domestic animals such as cattle, sheep, and goats. It mainly acts by uncoupling of oxidative phosphorylation in flukes. Along with niclosamide, another tapeworm drug, it has been recently found to display "strong in vivo and in vitro activity against methicillin-resistant Staphylococcus aureus (MRSA)".
