= Salicylanilide =

Names
- Preferred IUPAC name 2-Hydroxy-N-phenylbenzamide
- Other names 2-Hydroxybenzanilide

Identifiers
CAS Number	87-17-2
3D model (JSmol)	Interactive image
Beilstein Reference	1108135
ChEBI	CHEBI:239133
ChEMBL	ChEMBL82970
ChemSpider	6610
ECHA InfoCard	100.001.571
EC Number	201-727-8
KEGG	C18915
PubChem CID	6872
UNII	LHP8NEY345
CompTox Dashboard (EPA)	DTXSID7021784
- InChI: InChI=1S/C13H11NO2/c15-12-9-5-4-8-11(12)13(16)14-10-6-2-1-3-7-10/h1-9,15H,(H,14,16) Key: WKEDVNSFRWHDNR-UHFFFAOYSA-N; InChI=1/C13H11NO2/c15-12-9-5-4-8-11(12)13(16)14-10-6-2-1-3-7-10/h1-9,15H,(H,14,16) Key: WKEDVNSFRWHDNR-UHFFFAOYAI
- SMILES: C1=CC=C(C=C1)NC(=O)C2=CC=CC=C2O

Properties
Chemical formula	C_{13}H_{11}NO_{2}
Molar mass	213.236 g·mol^{−1}
Appearance	White to off-white crystalline solid
Melting point	136 to 138 °C (277 to 280 °F; 409 to 411 K)

Hazards
- GHS labelling
Pictograms	(GHS07: Exclamation mark) (GHS09: Environmental hazard)
Signal word	Warning
Hazard statements	H315, H319, H335, H400
Precautionary statements	P261, P264, P271, P273, P280, P302+P352, P304+P340, P305+P351+P338, P312, P321, P332+P313, P337+P313, P362, P391, P403+P233, P405, P501
- Except where otherwise noted, data are given for materials in their standard state (at 25 °C [77 °F], 100 kPa). verify (what is ?) Infobox references

Salicylanilide is a chemical compound which is the amide of salicylic acid and aniline. It is classified as both a salicylamide and an anilide.

Derivatives of salicylanilide have a variety of pharmacological uses. Chlorinated derivatives including niclosamide, oxyclozanide, and rafoxanide are used as anthelmintics, especially against parasitic flatworms. Brominated derivatives including dibromsalan, metabromsalan, and tribromsalan are used as topical antibacterials and antifungals.

Bromochlorosalicylanilide

Niclosamide

Oxyclozanide

Rafoxanide
