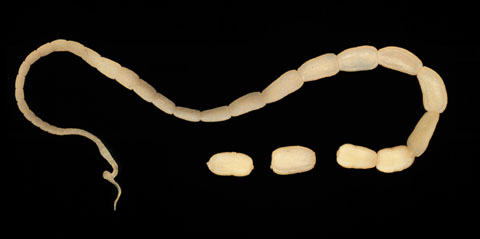
- Adult Dipylidium caninum. The scolex of the worm is very narrow and the proglottids get larger as they mature.

Scientific classification
- Kingdom: Animalia
- Phylum: Platyhelminthes
- Class: Cestoda
- Order: Cyclophyllidea
- Family: Dipylidiidae
- Genus: Dipylidium
- Species: D. caninum

Binomial name
- Dipylidium caninum (Linnaeus, 1758)

Synonyms
- Dipylidium carracidoi Lopez-Neyra, 1929; Taenia canina Linnaeus, 1758; Taenia cucumerina Bloch, 1782

= Dipylidium =

Species of flatworm

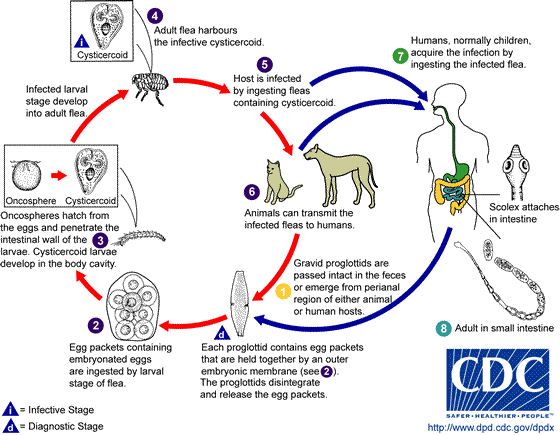
Dipylidium life cycle

Dipylidium caninum, also called the flea tapeworm, double-pored tapeworm, or cucumber tapeworm (in reference to the shape of its cucumber-seed-like proglottids, though these also resemble grains of rice or sesame seeds) is a cyclophyllid cestode that infects organisms afflicted with fleas and canine chewing lice, including dogs, cats, and sometimes human pet-owners, especially children.

== Adult morphology ==
The adult worm is about 18 inches (46 cm) long. Gravid proglottids containing the worm's microscopic eggs are either passed in the definitive host's feces or may leave their host spontaneously and are then ingested by microscopic flea larvae (the intermediate hosts) in the surrounding environment. As in all members of family Dipylidiidae, proglottids of the adult worm have genital pores on both sides (hence the name double-pore tapeworm). Each side has a set of male and female reproductive organs. The uterus is paired with 16 to 20 radial branches each. The scolex has a retractable rostellum with four rows of hooks, along with the four suckers that all cyclophyllid cestodes have. Adult worm scolex is rhomboidal in shape with a transverse diameter of 250–500 um.

== Life cycle ==
The definitive host within this life cycle is primarily canines, and occasionally felines, and in rare cases young children. The intermediate hosts include fleas (Ctenocephalides spp.) and chewing lice (Trichodectes spp.). The first stage in the life cycle is when the gravid proglottids are either passed out through faecal matter, or actively crawl out of the anus of the host. The gravid proglottids once out of the definitive host release eggs. Then, an intermediate host (the larval stage of a flea or chewing louse) will ingest an egg, which develops into a cysticercoid larva. The cysticercoid larva remains viable, but is not infective to carnivores until the flea hatches to an adult and begins feeding on a host (e.g. a dog). Approximately 36 hours after the flea has consumed a blood meal, the infective metacestode develops inside the flea. The metacestode larva must be ingested in a flea by the dog or cat during grooming in order to develop. Humans can also become infected by D. caninum by accidentally ingesting an infected flea. In the small intestine of the definitive host, the metacestode develops into an adult tapeworm, which reaches maturity 4–6 weeks after ingestion. This adult tapeworm produces proglottids, and over time, the proglottids mature and become gravid and eventually detach from the tapeworm and the life cycle starts all over again.

== Geographic distribution ==
This parasite occurs worldwide in animals, such as dogs and cats, as well as in humans, though to a significantly lesser degree. It is the most common tapeworm of dogs and is relatively common in cats. Despite human diplydiasis being rare, instances have been reported from every inhabited continent.

Human instances of diplydiasis are reported globally, and unsurprisingly roughly one third of the cases occur in children less than 6 months of age. The most at-risk age group is those that range from 2 months to 4 years old.

== Pet infections ==
Tapeworm infection usually does not cause pathology in the dog or cat, and most pets show no adverse reaction to infection other than increased appetite. The bulk of infections are asymptomatic and the infections that do result in symptoms are generally mildly so. Pets behavior may reflect the presence of anal discomfort and itching, or pruritus. This could result in the 'butt-scooching" across the floor, grass or carpeting. It may be accompanied by slight gastrointestinal disturbances, as this is the region where the worms inhabit. Though not a pathology of the diplydiasis, the most unnerving sign of the infection is the presence of proglottids in the animals, or child's, feces. These proglottids can also be found near the perianal region, in the feces, and in diapers (children). The motile proglottids can actively crawl out of the anus of the infected animal/person and migrate small distances, thus potentially covering this array of neighboring surfaces. It is from these locations that the larval stage of the flea will come along and ingest them. Then the metacestode stage, a cysticercoid, develops in the coelomic cavity (abdominal cavity; main body cavity) of the flea larvae and remains there as the flea matures into an adult. These freshly passed proglottids are motile, allowing them to also be found on the floor and furniture, from a migration out of a pets anus and could be compared to resembling fly larvae, or maggots.

The other tapeworm infecting cats is Taenia taeniaeformis, though this form is much less commonly encountered than D. caninum.

A recent (2018) study using genetical analysis and experimental infections and life-cycles showed that two different distinct genotypes of D. caninum occur respectively in dogs and in cats, and suggested that two different species might be involved.

== Human infections ==
A human infection with D. caninum is rare, but if an infection does occur, it is more likely to occur in young children. As of the early 1960s, the number of cases of D. caninum in the U.S. was a mere 21. Therefore, human infection of Dipylidium caninum, or diplydiasis, is a rare occasion. It is largely agreed across the parasitology community that despite the reports of this disease occurring, there are very likely numerous cases that have gone unnoticed and unreported because of its subtle and minor pathology in humans, in addition to its scarceness in clinical records. The adult tapeworm grows within the host for 3–4 weeks after initial infection. The number of parasites the host is initially infected with is directly related to the number of cysticercoid juveniles present in the fleas coelom. The load of parasites present in the humans is lower, luckily, as the life cycle is not occurring in the ideal conditions or species as humans are not the definitive host.

Many cases have an unexciting course of infection, as can be depicted in two cases occurring in the 1960s. The first case occurred in a 9-month-old female. Mother found motile proglottids the child's diaper, later identified as D. caninum. The child had no apparent signs or symptoms. The presumed source of infections was one of the family's four Labrador retrievers, two of which were found to already have been infected with D. caninum. The second additional case occurred in an 18-month-old male. Mother found motile proglottids in the child's diaper and again, the child was symptom-free. A puppy in the household was found to be infected and thus was the source of the child infection. Young children and toddlers are at a greater risk of infection because of how they interact with their pets. A human may attain an infection by accidentally ingesting an infected flea through food contamination or through the saliva of pets. Most infections are asymptomatic, but sometimes these symptoms may be identified in an infected individual: mild diarrhea, abdominal colic, anorexia, restlessness, constipation, rectal itching, and pain due to emerging proglottids through the anal cavity.

== Treatment and prevention ==
As with most tapeworm infections, the drugs of choice to kill adult tapeworms are praziquantel or niclosamide. Pets can be prevented from becoming infested with tapeworm if they are treated prophylactically with a product which kills the intermediate host (the flea) before the infective metacestode can develop. Some isoxazoline products are registered to prevent flea tapeworm infestations using this method.

== Gallery ==
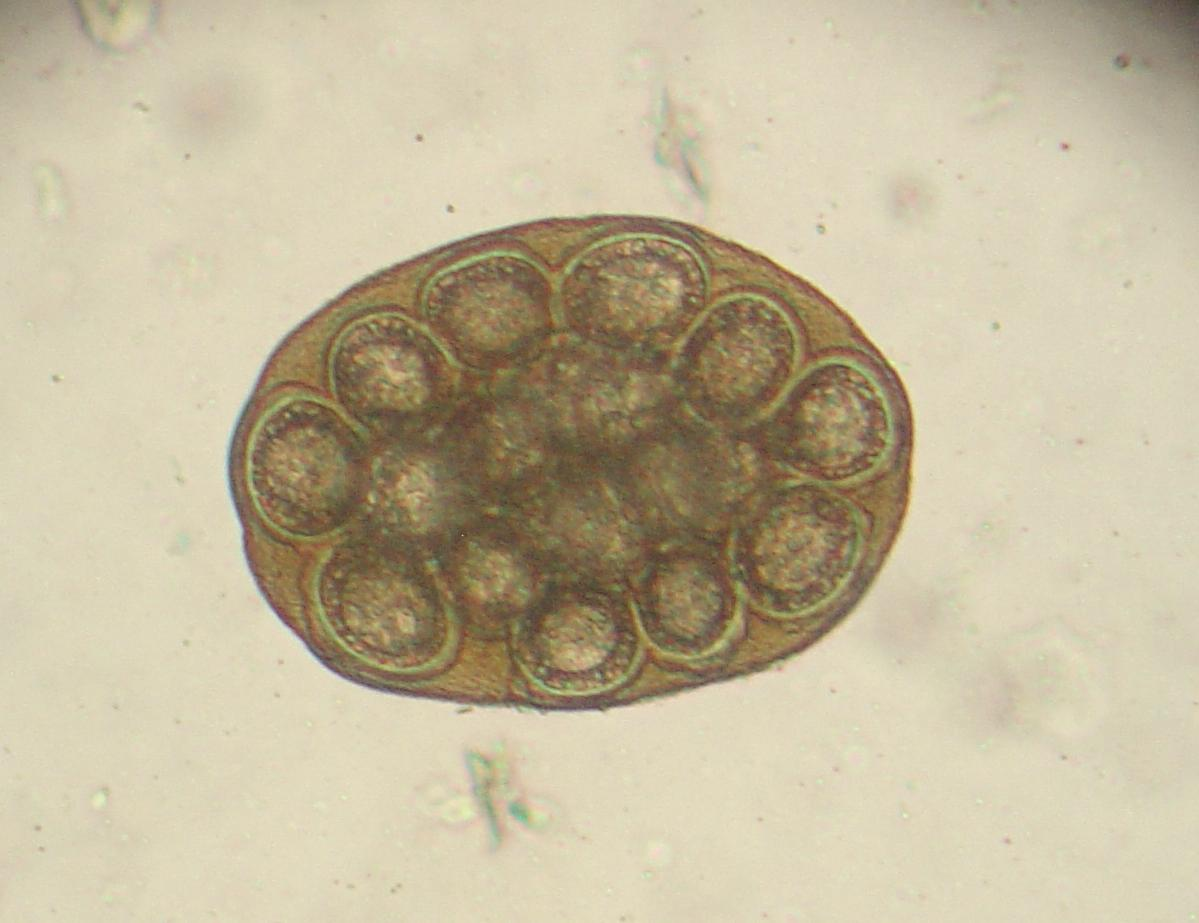
Dipylidium caninum egg packet

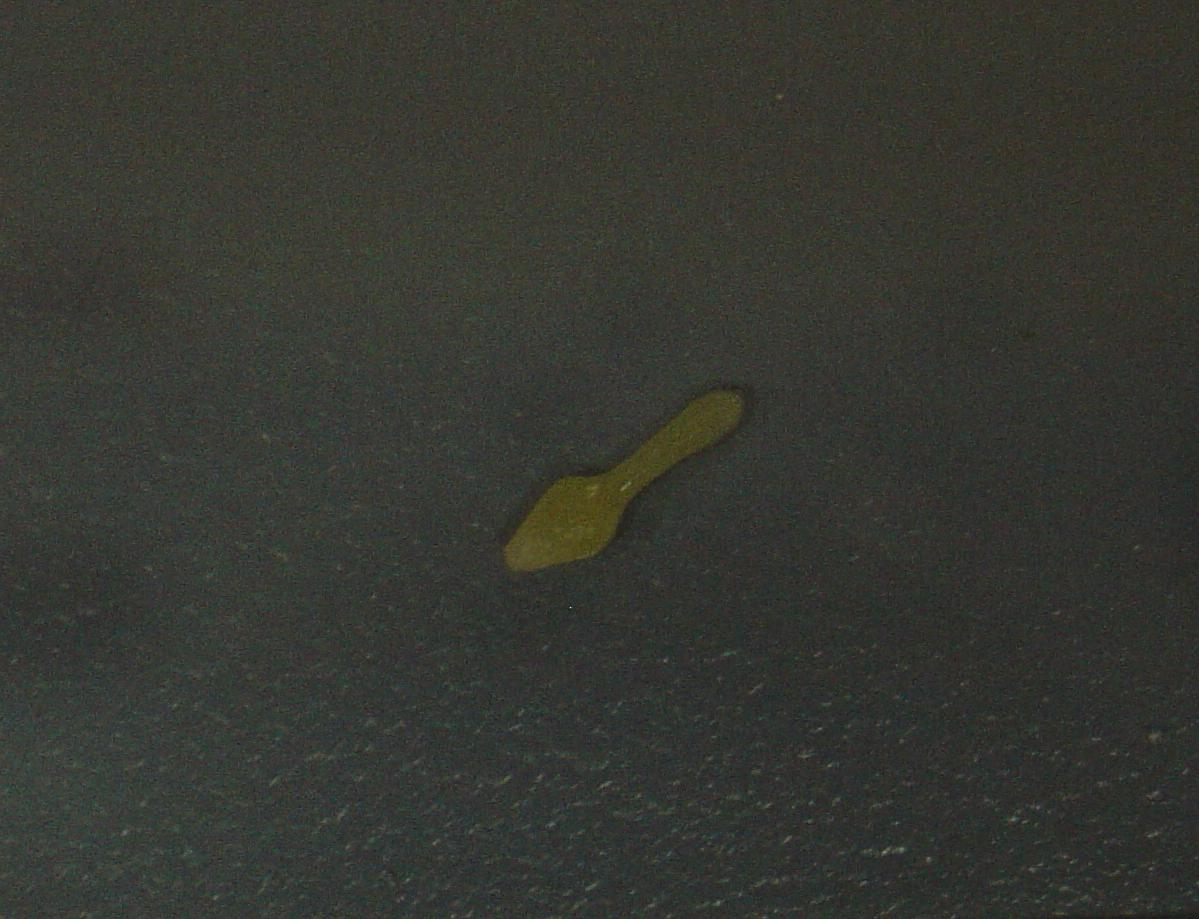
D. caninum proglottid

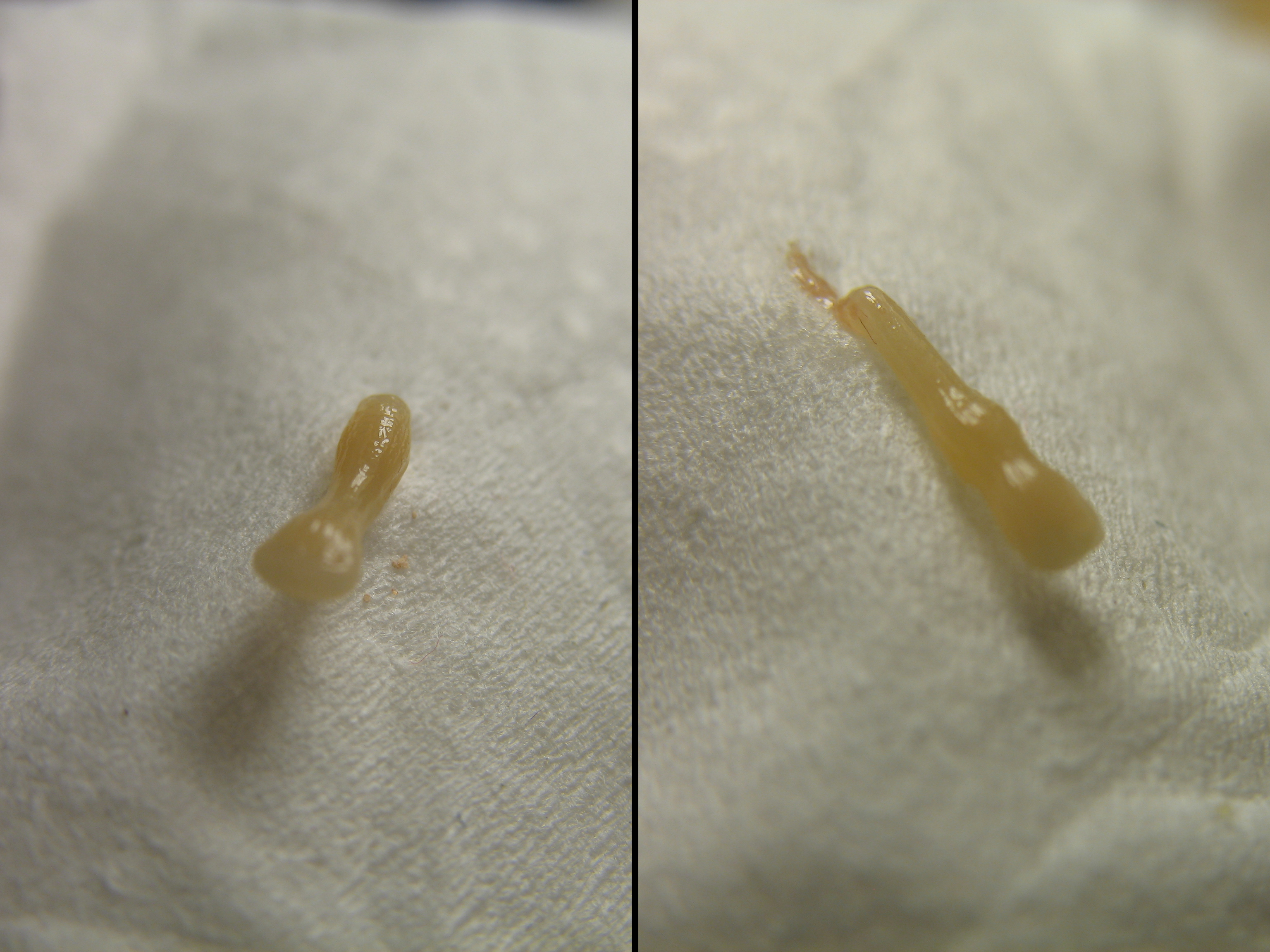
D. caninum

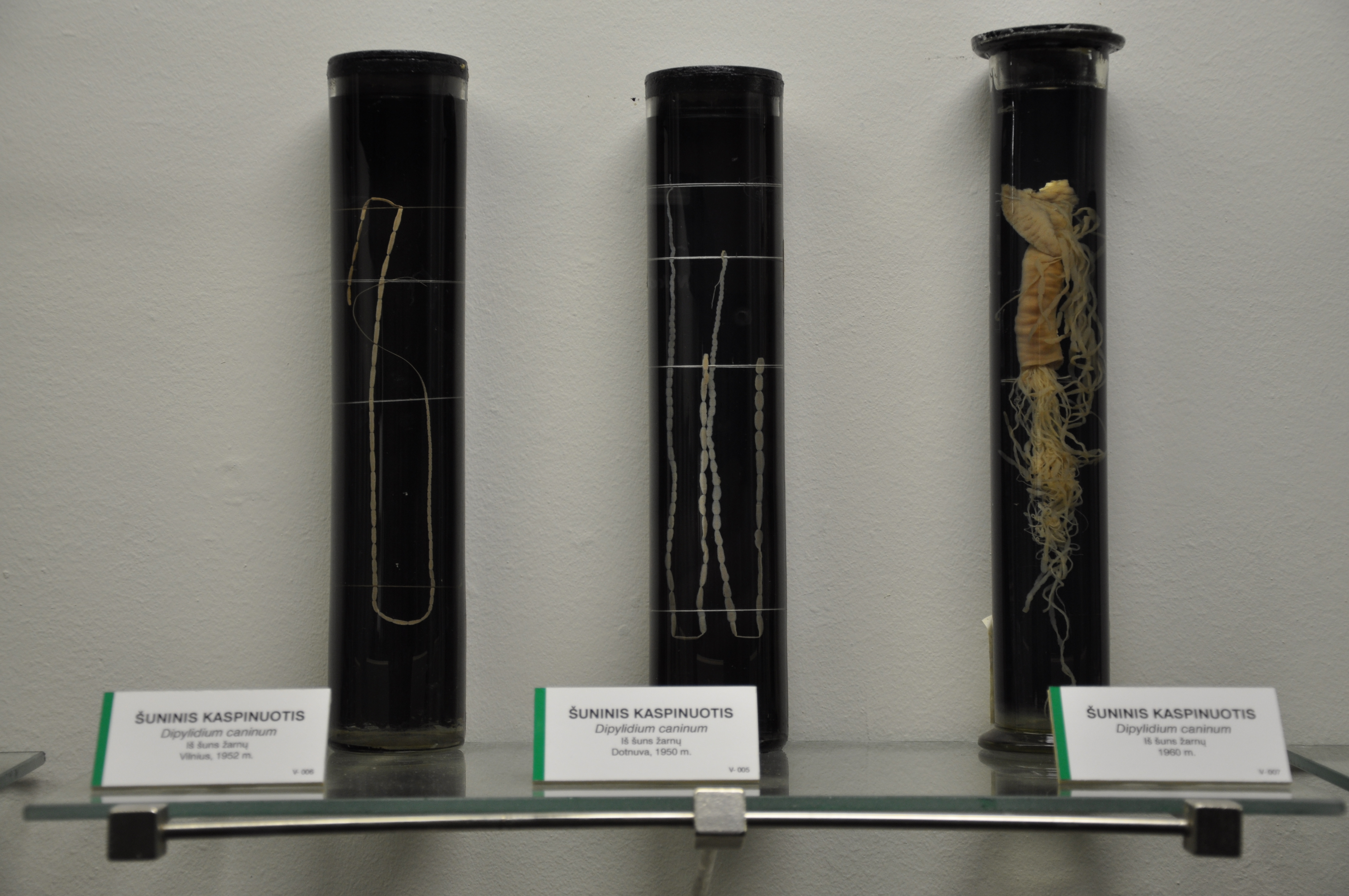
D. caninum worms
