= Mebendazole =

Medication for parasitic worm infestations

Clinical data
- Trade names: Vermox, Ovex, others
- Other names: MBZ
- AHFS/Drugs.com: Monograph
- MedlinePlus: a682315
- License data: US DailyMed: Mebendazole
- Pregnancy category: AU: B3
- Routes of administration: By mouth
- ATC code: P02CA01 (WHO) QP52AC09 (WHO)

Legal status
- Legal status: AU: S2 (Pharmacy medicine) / S5 and S6 for treatment of animals; CA: ℞-only / and OTC for treatment of animals; UK: POM (Prescription only) / P; US: ℞-only

Pharmacokinetic data
- Bioavailability: 2–10%
- Protein binding: 95%
- Metabolism: Extensive liver
- Elimination half-life: 3–6 hours
- Excretion: Feces, urine (5–10%)

Identifiers
- IUPAC name: Methyl (5-benzoyl-1H-benzimidazol-2-yl)carbamate
- CAS Number: 31431-39-7
- PubChem CID: 4030
- DrugBank: DB00643
- ChemSpider: 3890
- UNII: 81G6I5V05I
- KEGG: D00368
- ChEBI: CHEBI:6704
- ChEMBL: ChEMBL685
- CompTox Dashboard (EPA): DTXSID4040682
- ECHA InfoCard: 100.046.017

Chemical and physical data
- Formula: C_{16}H_{13}N_{3}O_{3}
- Molar mass: 295.298 g·mol^{−1}
- 3D model (JSmol): Interactive image
- Melting point: 288.5 °C (551.3 °F)
- SMILES: COC(=O)Nc3nc2ccc(C(=O)c1ccccc1)cc2[nH]3
- InChI: InChI=1S/C16H13N3O3/c1-22-16(21)19-15-17-12-8-7-11(9-13(12)18-15)14(20)10-5-3-2-4-6-10/h2-9H,1H3,(H2,17,18,19,21); Key:OPXLLQIJSORQAM-UHFFFAOYSA-N

Mebendazole (MBZ), sold under the brand name Vermox among others, is a medication used to treat a number of parasitic worm infestations. This includes ascariasis, pinworm infection, hookworm infections, guinea worm infections and hydatid disease, among others. It has been used for treatment of giardiasis but is not a preferred agent. It is taken by mouth.

Mebendazole is usually well tolerated. Common side effects include headache, vomiting, and ringing in the ears. If used at large doses it may cause bone marrow suppression. It is unclear if it is safe in pregnancy. Mebendazole is a broad-spectrum antihelminthic agent of the benzimidazole type.

Mebendazole came into use in 1971, after it was developed by Janssen Pharmaceutica in Belgium. It is on the World Health Organization's List of Essential Medicines. Mebendazole is available as a generic medication.

== Medical use ==
Mebendazole is a highly effective, broad-spectrum antihelmintic indicated for the treatment of nematode infestations, including roundworm, hookworm, whipworm, threadworm (pinworm), and the intestinal form of trichinosis prior to its spread into the tissues beyond the digestive tract. Other drugs are used to treat worm infections outside the digestive tract, as mebendazole is poorly absorbed into the bloodstream. Mebendazole is used alone in those with mild to moderate infestations. It kills parasites relatively slowly, and in those with very heavy infestations, it can cause some parasites to migrate out of the digestive system, leading to appendicitis, bile duct problems, or intestinal perforation. To avoid this, heavily infested patients may be treated with piperazine, either before or instead of mebendazole. Piperazine paralyses the parasites, causing them to pass in the feces. It is also used rarely in the treatment of cystic echinococcosis, also known as hydatid disease. Evidence for effectiveness for this disease, however, is poor.

Mebendazole and other benzimidazole antihelmintics are active against both larval and adult stages of nematodes, and in the cases of roundworm and whipworm, kill the eggs, as well. Paralysis and death of the parasites occurs slowly, and elimination in the feces may require several days.

=== Special populations ===
Mebendazole has been shown to cause ill effects in pregnancy in animal models, and no adequate studies of its effects in human pregnancy have been conducted. Whether it can be passed by breastfeeding is unknown.

== Adverse effects ==
Mebendazole sometimes causes diarrhea, abdominal pain, and elevated liver enzymes. In rare cases, it has been associated with a dangerously low white blood cell count, low platelet count, and hair loss, with a risk of agranulocytosis in rare cases.

=== Drug interactions ===
Carbamazepine and phenytoin lower serum levels of mebendazole. Cimetidine does not appreciably raise serum mebendazole (in contrast to the similar drug albendazole), consistent with its poor systemic absorption.

Stevens–Johnson syndrome and the more severe toxic epidermal necrolysis can occur when mebendazole is combined with high doses of metronidazole.

== Mechanism ==
Mebendazole works by effectively inhibiting the formation of microtubules via binding to the colchicine binding site of β-tubulin, thereby blocking polymerization of tubulin dimers in intestinal cells of parasites. Administration of mebendazole results in the gradual immobilization and eventual death of the helminths. The primary mechanism of action appears to be the disruption of cytoplasmic microtubules. Effects of benzimidazoles like mebendazole on helminths include disruption of acetylcholinesterase secretion, inhibition of fumarate reductase and active glucose transport, uncoupling of oxidative phosphorylation and other metabolic perturbations.

Poor absorption in the digestive tract makes mebendazole an efficient drug for treating intestinal parasitic infections with limited adverse effects. However, mebendazole has an impact on mammalian cells, mostly by inhibiting polymerization of tubulin dimers, thereby disrupting essential microtubule structures such as mitotic spindle. Disassembly of the mitotic spindle then leads to apoptosis mediated via dephosphorylation of BCL-2 which allows pro-apoptotic protein BAX to dimerize and initiate programmed cell death.

Mebendazole has also been shown to have an effect on many different cancer cell lines. Since it can inhibit tubulin polymerization, it has a lethal effect on cancer cells. There have been studies in vitro and in vivo (mouse models) that show mebendazole targets various important cell processes that are crucial to cancer survival and proliferation. When these pathways are inhibited it can lead to apoptosis in these cancer cells.

== Society and culture ==
=== Availability ===
Mebendazole is available as a generic medication. Mebendazole is distributed in international markets by Johnson and Johnson and a number of generic manufacturers.

=== Economics ===
In the United States, mebendazole is sometimes sold at about 200 times the price of the same medication in other countries.
