= Anthelmintic =

Antiparasitic drugs that expel parasitic worms (helminths) from the body

Anthelmintic effect of papain on Heligmosomoides bakeri

Anthelmintics, anthelminthics, antihelmintics or antihelminthics are a group of antiparasitic drugs that expel parasitic worms (helminths) and other internal parasites from the body by either stunning or killing them without causing significant damage to the host. They may also be called vermifuges (those that stun) or vermicides (those that kill). Anthelmintics are used to treat people who are infected by helminths, a condition called helminthiasis. These drugs are used to treat infected animals, particularly small ruminants such as goats and sheep.

Anthelmintic medication is used in mass deworming campaigns of school-aged children in many developing countries, and for mass deworming of livestock. The drugs of choice for soil-transmitted helminths are mebendazole and albendazole; for schistosomiasis and tapeworms it is praziquantel.

== Types ==
Many early treatments were herbal, such as the oil of herbs of the genus Chenopodium that were given as anthelmintic treatment for centuries. In 1908 it was found that the active constituent was ascaridole. From the 1920s to the 1970s, halogenated hydrocarbons (such as chloroform, carbon tetrachloride, tetrachloroethylene and hexachloroethane) were used in a string of continually more efficacious anthelmintics, until their underlying host toxicity was revealed. The modern broad-spectrum anthelmintics were developed by pharmaceutical companies that can afford the screening programs and testing systems that modern drug development involves.

Historically, there have been three main classes of broad-spectrum anthelmintics. These are benzimidazoles, imidazothiazoles/tetrahydropyrimidines, and macrocyclic lactones.

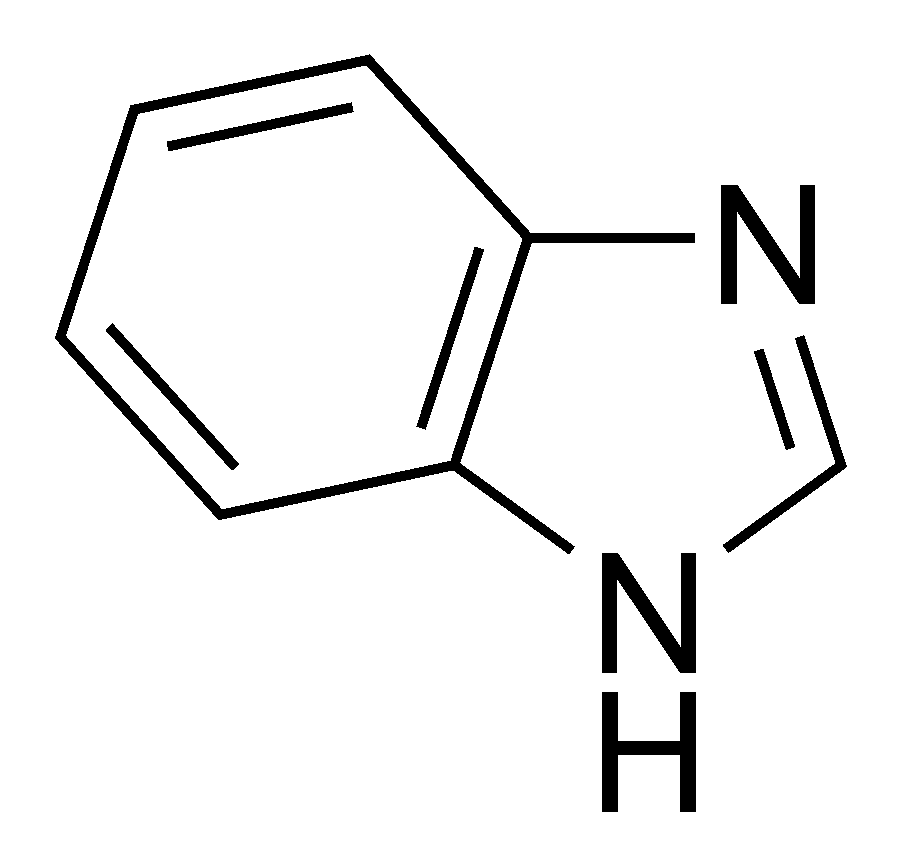
The benzimidazole nucleus

- Benzimidazoles disrupt parasitic worms' microtubules, a critical part of their cells' cytoskeletons. Drugs in this category include:
  - Albendazole – effective against threadworms, roundworms, whipworms, tapeworms, hookworms
  - Mebendazole – effective against various nematodes
  - Thiabendazole – effective against various nematodes
  - Fenbendazole – effective against various parasites
  - Triclabendazole – effective against liver flukes
  - Flubendazole – effective against most intestinal parasites
- Imidathiazoles/tetrahydropyrimidines are nicotinic acetylcholine receptor agonists, including:
  - Levamisole
  - Pyrantel pamoate – effective against most parasitic nematodes of the GIT
- Macrocyclic lactones are glutamate-gated chloride channel agonists, and include:
  - Avermectins (including ivermectin and moxidectin) - effective against most common intestinal worms, except tapeworms, for which praziquantel is commonly used in conjunction for mass dewormings
- Drugs not members of these three main categories include:
  - Diethylcarbamazine – effective against Wuchereria bancrofti, Brugia malayi, Brugia timori, and Loa loa
  - Salicylanilide – mitochondrial un-couplers such as Niclosamide and Oxyclozanide, and are used only for flatworm infections
  - Nitazoxanide – readily kills Ascaris lumbricoides, and also possesses antiprotozoal effects. This is also an ascaricide.
  - Oxamniquine – effective against flatworms (e.g., tapeworms and schistosoma)
  - Praziquantel – effective against flatworms (e.g., tapeworms and schistosoma)
  - Octadepsipeptides (e.g. Emodepside) – effective against a variety of gastrointestinal helminths
  - Monepantel (aminoacetonitrile class) – effective against a variety of nematodes including those resistant to other anthelmintic classes
  - Spiroindoles (e.g. derquantel) – effective against a variety of nematodes including those resistant to other anthelmintic classes
  - Artemisinin – shows anthelmintic activity

== Anthelmintic resistance ==
Anthelmintic resistance occurs when a heritable genetic change occurs in the parasite's DNA, rendering it insensitive to a previously effective anthelmintic drug. This is a particularly serious problem in helminth parasites of small ruminant farm animals. There are many factors that contribute to anthelmintic resistance, such as frequent, mass anthelmintic treatment, underdosing, treating repeatedly with only one anthelmintic, and resistance being transmitted during transfer of animals. Anthelmintic resistance in parasites is widespread; drug resistance exists in all livestock hosts and to all anthelmintic drug classes. This is a major threat to the sustainability of modern ruminant livestock production, resulting in reduced productivity, compromised animal health and welfare, and increased greenhouse gas emissions through increased parasitism and farm inputs. A database of published and unpublished European AR research on gastrointestinal nematodes was collated in 2020. A total of 197 publications were available for analysis, representing 535 studies in 22 countries and spanning the period 1980–2020. Results in sheep and goats since 2010 reveal an average prevalence of resistance to benzimidazoles of 86%, moxidectin 52%, and levamisole 48%. All major gastrointestinal nematode genera survived treatment in various studies. In cattle, prevalence of anthelmintic resistance varied between anthelmintic classes from 0–100% (benzimidazoles and macrocyclic lactones), 0–17% (levamisole) and 0–73% (moxidectin), and both Cooperia and Ostertagia survived treatment. However, resistance is not seen as often in the parasitic helminths that affect cattle, compared to sheep. Reasons for this include the fact that cattle receive anthelmintic drugs less frequently than sheep, and the different nature of their faecal pats that could leave different numbers of resistant infective larvae on the pasture. Unlike sheep, cattle can develop sufficient immunoprotection against such parasites.

Both in vitro (egg hatch assay, larval development test, larval motility test, polymerase chain reaction and in vivo methods (fecal egg count reduction test) can be used to detect anthelmintic resistance.^{[11]}

Treatment with an antihelmintic drug kills worms whose phenotype renders them susceptible to the drug, but resistant parasites survive and pass on their "resistance" genes. Resistant varieties accumulate, and treatment failure finally occurs.

The ways in which anthelmintics are used have contributed to a major anthelmintic resistance issue worldwide. From the 1950s to the 1980s, new classes of effective and inexpensive anthelmintics were made available every decade, leading to excessive use throughout agriculture and disincentivizing alternative anti-nematodal strategies. Developing new anthelmintics is time-consuming and expensive therefore, it is important to use the ones that currently exist in a way that will minimize or prevent the development of anthelmintic resistance.^{[11]} Some of these methods are ensuring animals are not being underdosed, rotating the anthelmintics that are being used, and rotation of grazing land to reduce the parasite population. Other methods include using a combination of multiple different anthelmintics, and the use of refugia based strategies. Refugia refers to the portion of the parasite population not being exposed to anthelmintics. This population is therefore not undergoing selection for resistance. Use of refugia helps to slow down the speed of evolution of resistance to anthelmintic drugs. Due to the problem of anthelmintic resistance, research into alternatives is continuing, including in the field of rational drug design.

== See also ==
- Dysphania ambrosioides, an herb native to Central and South America
- Santonin, a historical anthelmintic no longer in use
- 4-Hexylresorcinol
