= Parasitic worm =

Large type of parasitic organism

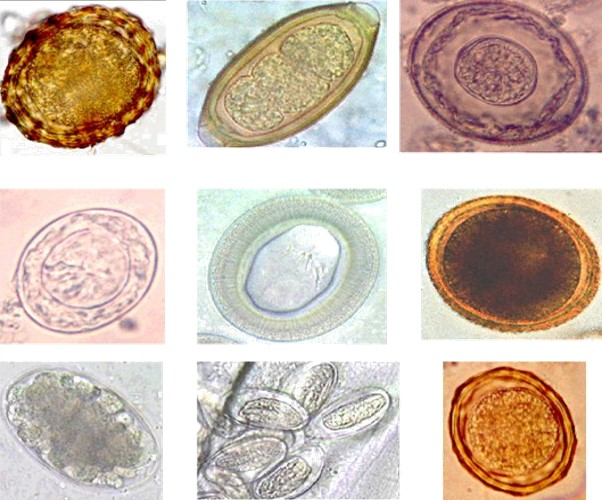
Eggs of different species of parasitic worm

Parasitic worms, also known as helminths, are a polyphyletic group of large macroparasites; adults can generally be seen with the naked eye. Many are intestinal worms that are soil-transmitted and infect the gastrointestinal tract. Other parasitic worms such as schistosomes reside in blood vessels.

Some parasitic worms, including leeches and monogeneans, are ectoparasites – thus, they are not classified as helminths, which are endoparasites.

Parasitic worms live in and feed in living hosts. They receive nourishment and protection while disrupting their hosts' ability to absorb nutrients. This can cause weakness and disease in the host, and poses a global health and economic problem. Parasitic worms cannot reproduce entirely within their host's body; they have a life cycle that includes some stages that need to take place outside of the host. Helminths are able to survive in their mammalian hosts for many years due to their ability to manipulate the host's immune response by secreting immunomodulatory products. All parasitic worms produce eggs during reproduction. These eggs have a strong shell that protects them against a range of environmental conditions. The eggs can therefore survive in the environment for many months or years.

Many of the worms referred to as helminths are intestinal parasites. An infection by a helminth is known as helminthiasis, helminth infection, or intestinal worm infection. There is a naming convention which applies to all helminths: the ending "-asis" (or in veterinary science: "-osis") is added at the end of the name of the worm to denote the infection with that particular worm. For example, Ascaris is the name of a type of helminth, and ascariasis is the name of the infection caused by that helminth.

== Taxonomy ==
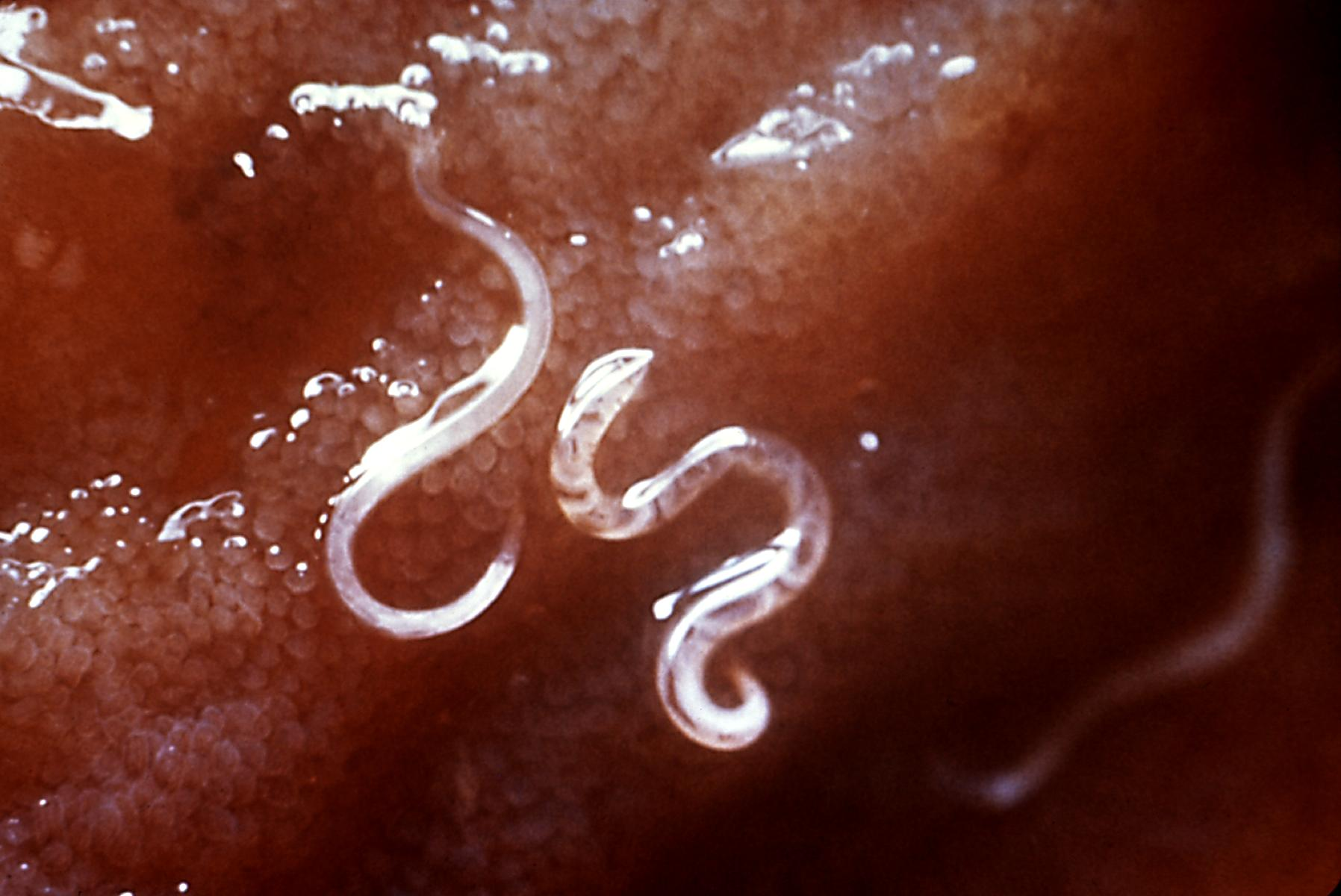
Hookworms attached to the intestinal mucosa

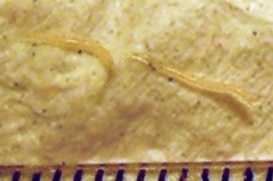
Two pinworms

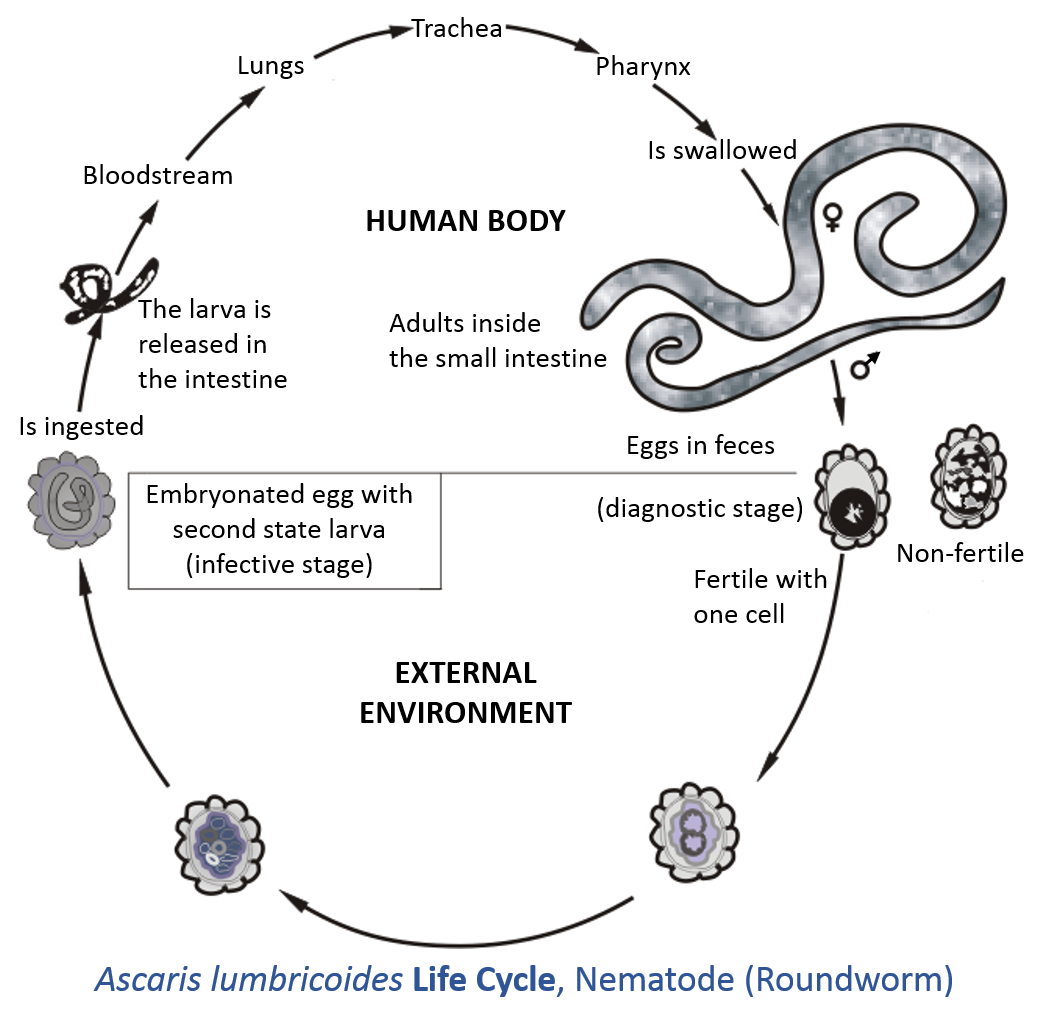
Image showing life cycle inside and outside of the human body of one fairly typical and well described helminth: Ascaris lumbricoides

Helminths are a group of organisms which share a similar form but are not necessarily evolutionarily related, which makes "helminth" a polyphyletic assemblage. There is no real consensus on the taxonomy (or groupings) of the helminths, particularly within the nematodes. The term "helminth" contains a number of phyla, many of which are completely unrelated. However, for practical considerations the term is currently used to describe four phyla with superficial similarities: Annelida (ringed or segmented worms), Platyhelminthes (flatworms), Nematoda (roundworms), and Acanthocephala (thorny-headed worms). The phylum Platyhelminthes includes two classes of worms of particular medical significance: the cestodes (tapeworms) and the trematodes (flukes and blood flukes), depending on whether or not they have segmented bodies.

There may be as many as 300,000 species of parasites affecting vertebrates, and as many as 300 affecting humans alone.

Helminths of importance in the sanitation field are the human parasites, and are classified as Nemathelminthes (nematodes) and Platyhelminthes, depending on whether they possess a round or flattened body, respectively.

Ringworm (dermatophytosis) is actually caused by various fungi, and not by a parasitic worm.

== Reproduction and life cycle ==
The lifetime of adult worms varies tremendously from one species to another but is generally in the range of 1 to 8 years (see following table). This lifetime of several years is a result of their ability to manipulate the immune response of their hosts by secreting immunomodulatory products.

Helminths can be either hermaphroditic (having the sex organs of both sexes), like tapeworms and flukes (not including the blood fluke), or have their sexes differentiated, like the roundworms. All helminths produce eggs (also called ova) for reproduction.

=== Eggs ===
Generally, thousands or even hundreds of thousands of eggs are produced each time the female worm deposits its eggs - a process called oviposition. There is a large variation in the number of eggs produced by different species of worm at one time; it varies in the range of 3,000 to 700,000. The frequency of egg deposition from an adult helminth is generally daily, and can occur up to six times per day for some Taenia species. Adult trematodes lay smaller numbers of eggs compared to cestodes or nematodes. However, the egg develops into a miracidia from which thousands of cercariae, or swimming larvae, develop. This means that one egg may produce thousands of adult worms. Helminth eggs remain viable for 1–2 months in crops and for many months in soil, fresh water, and sewage, or even for several years in feces, fecal sludge (historically called night soil), and sewage sludge – a period that is much longer compared to other microorganisms.

Helminth eggs are resistant to various environmental conditions due to the composition of the egg shell. Each helminth egg species has 3 to 4 layers with different physical and chemical characteristics:

1. the 1 to 2 outer layers are formed of mucopolysaccharides and proteins,
2. the middle layers consist of chitinous material and serve to give structure and mechanical resistance to the eggs, and
3. the inner layer is composed of lipids and proteins and is useful to protect eggs from desiccation, strong acid and bases, oxidants and reductive agents as well as detergent and proteolytic compounds.

=== Larvae ===
Larvae hatch from eggs, either inside or outside the host, depending on the type of helminth. For eggs in moist soil at optimal temperature and oxygen levels, the embryo develops into an infective larva after 2 to 4 weeks, named "second-stage larva". Once ingested by a host, this larva has the ability to get out of the egg, hatch in the small intestine and migrate to different organs. These infective larvae (or "infective eggs") may remain viable in soil for two years or longer.

The process of larval maturation in the host can take from about two weeks up to four months, depending on the helminth species.

The following table shows the principal morphological and reproductive distinctions for three helminth groups:

		Tapeworms (Cestodes)		Flukes (Trematodes)	Roundworms (Nematodes)			
Examples		Taenia solium, Taenia saginata, Hymenolepis spp., Echinococcus granulosus, Echinococcus multilocularis, Multiceps multiceps		Schistosoma mansoni, Schistosoma japonicum, Fasciola hepatica	Ascaris spp., Enterobius, Filarioidea, Onchocerca spp., Rhabditis spp., Trichuris spp., Necator americanus, Ancylostoma spp.			
Pathological conditions caused in humans		Tapeworm infection, echinococcosis, alveolar echinococcosis		Schistosomiasis, swimmer's itch	Ascariasis, enterobiasis (pinworm infection, oxyuriasis), filariasis, dracunculiasis (guinea worm), elephantiasis, enterobiasis (pinworm), filariasis, hookworm infection (includes Necatoriasis and Ancylostoma duodenale infection), onchocerciasis, trichinosis, trichuriasis (whipworm)			
Shape		Segmented plane		Unsegmented plane	Cylindrical			
Body cavity		None		None	Present			
Body covering		Tegument		Tegument	Cuticle			
Digestive tube		None		Ends in cecum	Ends in anus			
Sex		Hermaphroditic		Hermaphroditic, except schistosomes which are dioecious	Dioecious			
Attachment organs		Sucker or bothridia, and rostellum with hooks		Oral sucker and ventral sucker or acetabulum	Lips, teeth, filariform extremities, and dentary plates			
Number of species		6000		Estimated > 15,000 Registered > 9,000	Estimated > 800,000 to 1,000,000 Registered > 25,000			
Number of species known to infect humans		40		16	> 12,000			
Species		Hymenolepis nana	Taenia solium /Taenia saginata	Fasciola hepatica	Ascaris lumbricoides	Hookworm	Trichuris trichiura	Toxocara spp.
Timeline of lifecycle stages	Larval formation		Some days (eggs can survive for months)	9–15 days	18 days to several weeks	1–2 days	15–30 days	
Timeline of lifecycle stages	Larval growth		After hatching, the larvae develop into cysticercoid, which can survive for years in an animal	5–7 weeks as cercariae in snails and longer periods in wet environments as encysted metacercariae	10–14 days	5–10 days (after maturing can survive for weeks outside the host)	60–70 days (from hatching to mature state)	5–6 days
Timeline of lifecycle stages	Maturation to adult		2 months (from cysticercoid to adult)	3–4 months	2–3 months	2–8 weeks (can become dormant for months)	60–70 days (from hatching to mature state)	
Timeline of lifecycle stages	Lifespan of adult worm	4–6 weeks	Several years	8–10 years	1–2 years	Several years	1 year	
Eggs laid per day		250,000 to 700,000		3,000 to 25,000	3,000 to 250,000			
Egg deposition	Frequency		up to 6 times a day		daily	daily	daily	
Egg deposition	Number of eggs per event		50,000-100,000		200,000 to 250,000 or more	5,000-10,000	3,000-20,000	
Larvae per egg		1	1	300 cercariae (Schistosoma), 250,000 metacercariae (Fasciola)	1	1	1	1

Draft genomes for all categories of helminth have been sequenced in recent years and are available through the ParaSite sub-portal of WormBase.

== Use in medicine ==
Parasitic worms have been used as a medical treatment for various diseases, particularly those involving an overactive immune response. As humans have evolved with parasitic worms, proponents argue they are needed for a healthy immune system. Scientists are looking for a connection between the prevention and control of parasitic worms and the increase in allergies such as hay-fever in developed countries. Removal of parasitic worms from areas is correlated with an increase in autoimmune disorders in those areas. Parasitic worms may be able to damp down the immune system of their host, making it easier for them to live in the intestine without coming under attack. This may be one mechanism for their proposed medicinal effect.

One study suggests a link between the rising rates of metabolic syndrome in the developed worlds and the largely successful efforts of Westerners to eliminate intestinal parasites. The work suggests eosinophils (a type of white blood cell) in fat tissue play an important role in preventing insulin resistance by secreting interleukin 4, which in turn switches macrophages into "alternative activation". Alternatively-activated macrophages are important to maintaining glucose homeostasis (i.e., blood sugar regulation). Helminth infection causes an increase in eosinophils. In the study, the authors fed rodents a high-fat diet to induce metabolic syndrome, and then injected them with helminths. Helminth infestation improved the rodents' metabolism. The authors concluded:

Although sparse in blood of persons in developed countries, eosinophils are often elevated in individuals in rural developing countries where intestinal parasitism is prevalent and metabolic syndrome rare. We speculate that eosinophils may have evolved to optimize metabolic homeostasis during chronic infections by ubiquitous intestinal parasites....

=== Human stool samples ===
For medical purposes, the exact number of helminth eggs is less important and therefore most diagnoses are made simply by identifying the appearance of the worm or eggs in feces. Due to the large quantity of eggs laid, physicians can diagnose using as few as one or two fecal smears. The Kato technique (also called the Kato-Katz technique) is a laboratory method for preparing human stool samples prior to searching for parasite eggs. Eggs per gram is a laboratory test that determines the number of eggs per gram of feces in patients suspected of having a parasitological infection, such as schistosomiasis.

== Relevance for sanitation ==
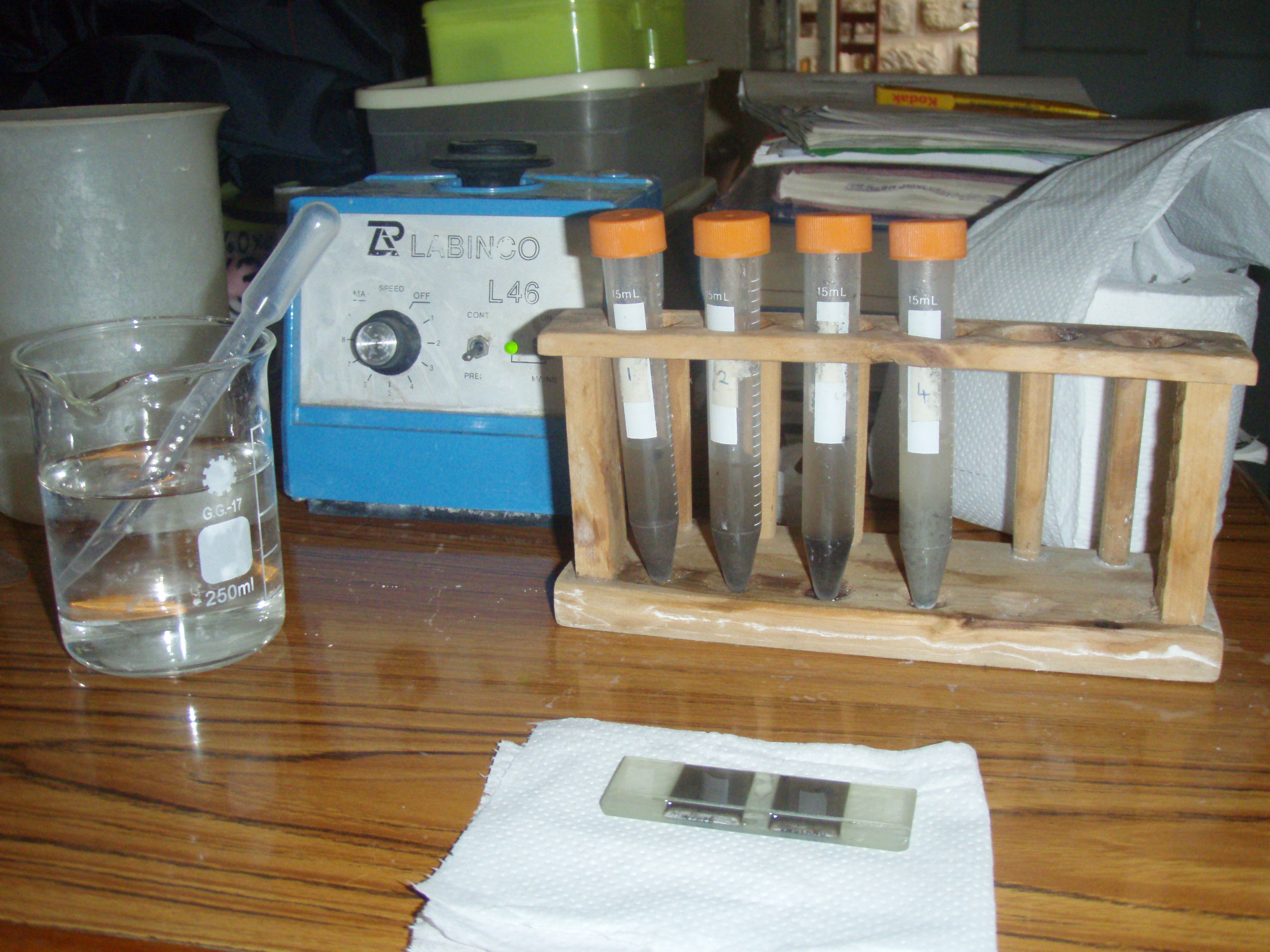
Processed helminth eggs samples from a dry toilet in Kenya

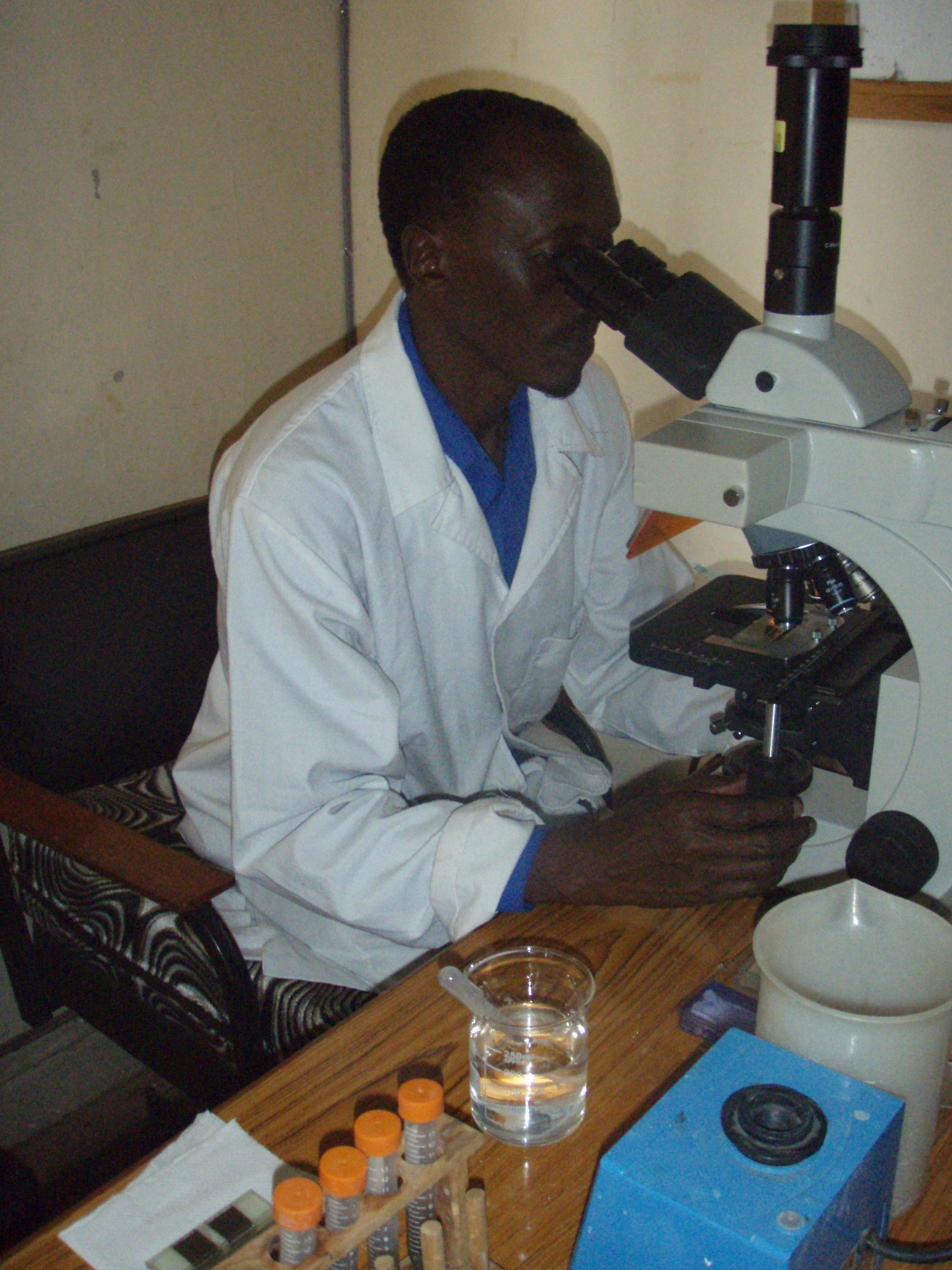
Analysing for helminth eggs in samples of feces from a dry toilet in Kenya

Helminth eggs can reach the soil when polluted wastewater, sewage sludge or human waste are used as fertilizer. Such soil is often characterized by moist and warm conditions. Therefore, the risk of using contaminated wastewater and sludge in agricultural fields is a real problem, especially in poor countries, where this practice is prevalent. Helminth eggs are regarded as the main biological health risk when applying sewage sludge, fecal sludge or fecal matter on agricultural soils. The eggs are the infective stage of the helminths' life cycle for causing the disease helminthiasis.

Due to this strong shell, helminth eggs or ova remain viable in soil, fresh water and sewage for many months. In feces, fecal sludge and sewage sludge they can even remain viable for several years. Helminth eggs of concern in wastewater used for irrigation have a size between 20 and 90 μm and a relative density of 1.06–1.23. It is very difficult to inactivate helminth eggs, unless temperature is increased above 40 °C or moisture is reduced to less than 5%. Eggs that are no longer viable do not produce any larvae. In the case of Ascaris lumbricoides (giant roundworm), which has been considered the most resistant and common helminth type, fertilized eggs deposited in soil are resistant to desiccation but are, at this stage of development, very sensitive to environmental temperatures: The reproduction of a fertilized egg within the eggshell develops at an environmental soil temperature about 25 °C which is lower than the body temperature of the host (i.e., 37 °C for humans). However, development of the larvae in the egg stops at temperatures below 15.5 °C, and eggs cannot survive temperatures much above 38 °C. If the temperature is around 25 °C, the infectiousness occurs after nearly 10 days of incubation.

=== Removal versus inactivation ===
Processes that remove particles, such as sedimentation, filtration or coagulation-flocculation physically remove helminth eggs from wastewater (but do not inactivate them). Therefore, waste stabilization ponds (lagoons), storage basins, constructed wetlands, rapid filtration or upflow anaerobic sludge blanket (UASB) reactors can be used.

Helminth ova cannot be inactivated with chlorine, UV light or ozone (in the latter case at least not with economical doses because >36 mg/L ozone are needed with 1 hour contact time).

Helminth ova can be inactivated in sewage sludge treatment if the temperature is increased over 40 °C or moisture is reduced to less than 5%. Best results can be obtained when both of these conditions are met together for an extended period of time. Details about the contact time under these conditions and other related environmental factors are generally not well-defined for every type of helminth egg species. Helminth eggs are considered highly resistant biological structures.

=== Measurements ===
==== Indicator organism ====
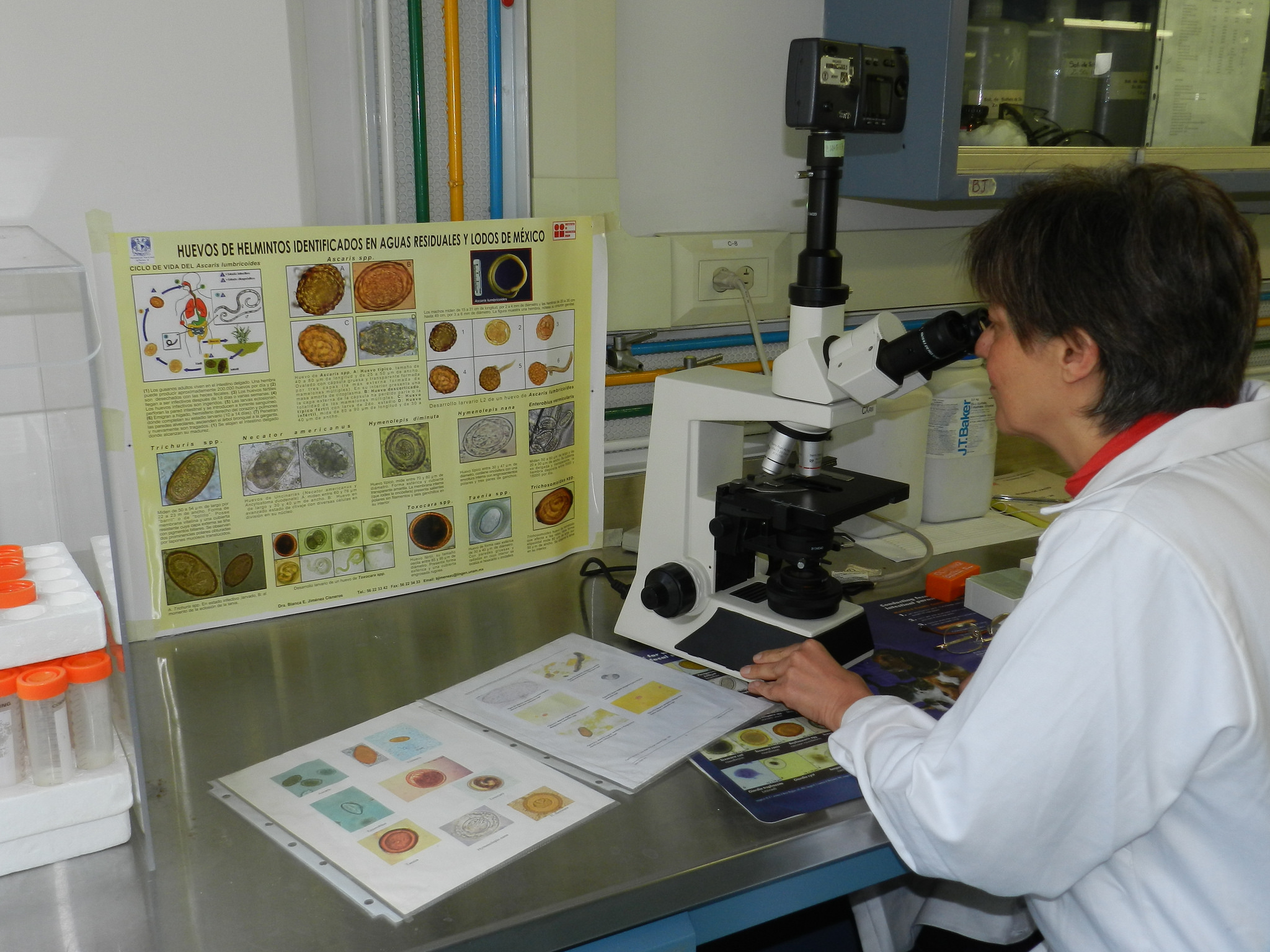
Identification and quantification of helminth eggs at UNAM university in Mexico City, Mexico

The eggs from helminths (parasitic worms) are a commonly used indicator organism to assess the safety of sanitation and wastewater reuse systems (such schemes are also called reuse of human excreta). This is because they are the most resistant pathogens of all types of pathogens (pathogens can be viruses, bacteria, protozoa and helminths). It means they are relatively hard to destroy through conventional treatment methods. They can survive for 10–12 months in tropical climates. These eggs are also called ova in the literature.

Helminth eggs that are found in wastewater and sludge stem from soil-transmitted helminths (STHs) which include Ascaris lumbricoides (Ascaris), Anclostoma duodenale, Necator americanus (hookworm), and Trichuris trichiura (whipworm). Ascaris and whipworm that are identified in reusable wastewater systems can cause certain diseases and complications if ingested by humans and pigs. Hookworms will plant and hatch their larvae into the soil where they grow until maturity. Once the hookworm eggs are fully developed, they infect organisms by crawling through the organism's skin.

The presence or absence of viable helminth eggs ("viable" meaning that a larva would be able to hatch from the egg) in a sample of dried fecal matter, compost or fecal sludge is often used to assess the efficiency of diverse wastewater and sludge treatment processes in terms of pathogen removal. In particular, the number of viable Ascaris eggs is often taken as an indicator for all helminth eggs in treatment processes as they are very common in many parts of the world and relatively easy to identify under the microscope. However, the exact inactivation characteristics may vary for different types of helminth eggs. The technique used for testing depends on the type of sample. When the helminth ova are in sludge, processes such as alkaline-post stabilization, acid treatment, and anaerobic digestion are used to reduce the amount of helminth ova in areas where there is a large amount. These methods make it possible for helminth ova to be within the healthy requirements of ≤1 helminth ova per liter. Dehydration is used to inactivate helminth ova in fecal sludge. This type of inactivation occurs when feces is stored between 1-2 years, a high total solids content (>50-60%) is present, items such as leaves, lime, earth, etc. are added, and at a temperature of 30°C or higher.

==== Environmental samples ====
For the purpose of setting treatment standards and reuse legislation, it is important to be able to determine the amount of helminth eggs in an environmental sample with some accuracy. The detection of viable helminth eggs in samples of wastewater, sludge or fresh feces (as a diagnostic tool for the infection helminthiasis) is not straight forward. In fact, many laboratories in developing countries lack the right equipment or skilled staff required to do so. An important step in the analytical methods is usually the concentration of the eggs in the sample, especially in the case of wastewater samples. A concentration step may not be required in samples of dried feces, e.g. samples collected from urine-diverting dry toilets.

== See also ==
- Helminthology – the study of parasitic worms and their effects on their hosts
- Anthelmintic
- Parasitism
- Schistosomiasis – a disease caused by parasitic flatworms called schistosomas
- Lymphatic filariasis caused by filarial worms
- Dracunculiasis caused by the roundworm Dracunculus medinensis (Guinea worm)
