= Robert L. Rausch =

American parasitologist and mammalogist

Robert Lloyd Rausch
- Born: July 20, 1921; Marion, Ohio, U.S.
- Died: October 6, 2012 (aged 91); Bainbridge Island, Washington, U.S.
- Education: Ohio State University, Michigan State University, University of Wisconsin
- Spouse: Virginia "Reggie" R. Rausch (née Sacressen)(m.1953, died 2019)
- Children: Ingrid R. Lindberg (née Rausch)
- Scientific career
- Fields: Parasitology, mammalogy and veterinary medicine
- Workplaces: Alaska Health Research Center (AHRC) of the United States Public Health Service (USPHS), University of Alaska Fairbanks, Western College of Veterinary Medicine at the University of Saskatchewan, University of Washington
- Author abbrev. (zoology): R. L. Rausch

Robert Lloyd Rausch (July 20, 1921 – October 6, 2012) was an American parasitologist, mammalogist, and veterinary physician.

== Education ==
Rausch began his academic studies at the Ohio State University, where in 1942 he earned a bachelor's degree in zoology and entomology and in 1945 he attained the title DVM, Doctor of Veterinary Medicine. His continued studies of parasitology and wildlife management led him to complete a Master of Science at Michigan State University in 1946 and a Ph.D. at the University of Wisconsin in 1949.

== Professional career ==
In 1948 Rausch took the position of senior assistant scientist at the Alaska Health Research Center (AHRC) of the United States Public Health Service (USPHS) in Anchorage in the Territory of Alaska. His job at the time was to research zoonoses in the indigenous population. As part of his research he completed extensive fieldwork in Brookskette, the North Slope region and St. Lawrence Island. He spent a lot of time with the Iñupiat, whose support assisted him with his research.

From 1967 to 1974 Rausch was head of the department for infectious diseases of the AHRC in Fairbanks and also taught at the University of Alaska Fairbanks until 1975 when he began work in Canada in the department of microbiology of Western College of Veterinary Medicine at the University of Saskatchewan. In 1978 he joined the University of Washington and taught until 1992 in the departments of Pathology and Comparative Medicine. Upon retirement he was named Professor Emeritus.

In addition to his research work and teaching, Rausch served as a consultant for numerous national and international organizations related to matters of public health, zoonotic diseases, and polar biology. He advised organizations such as the World Health Organization, the Pan American Health Organization, the National Science Foundation, the National Academy of Sciences and the government of the People's Republic of China.

From 1976 to 1978 Rausch was a member of the board of the Wildlife Disease Association. The American Society of Parasitologists chose him as their vice president in 1982 and as their president in 1984, each for a term of one year.

== Research ==
While working in Alaska in the 1940s and 1950s, Rausch performed pioneering work in the study of alveolar echinococcosis, which occurs often among the Inuit. His research in North America along with that of Hans Vogel at the Hamburg Institute for Tropical Medicine led to the discovery that fox tapeworm is the cause of the disease along with clarifying the fox tapeworm life cycle. His research on Echinococcus along with Jon J. Bernstein resulted in the discovery and description of Echinococcus vogeli, which in Latin America spread polycystic echinococcosis. Rausch also performed research related to other zoonoses such as Trichinosis, Rabies, Brucellosis and Tularemia.

Rausch placed great value on international Cooperation. From the 1960s he maintained intensive contact with Soviet colleagues and repeatedly toured Siberia. To this day the name of Robert L. Rausch is inextricably linked with the study of the parasitic fauna and the zoonoses of the polar regions including Alaska and Eastern Siberia.

Rauschs' scientific career lasted more than 60 years, and he authored more than 300 essays and book chapters. He and his wife Virginia R. Rausch amassed a collection of more than 60,000 predominantly parasitic worms preserved in alcohol, on glass slides, and as preparations for scanning electron microscopy. The Robert L. and Virginia R. Rausch Helminthological Collection is the foundation of the parasite collection of the Museum of Southwestern Biology at the University of New Mexico. Another 4,000 specimens of mammals are also in this museum. Almost 800 collection items, including 133 type specimens, are located in the United States National Parasite Collection.

== Awards ==
- Henry Baldwin Ward Medal of the American Society of Parasitologists (1961)
- Meritorious Service Medal by the United States Public Health Service (1965)
- Establishment of the Robert and Virginia Rausch Visiting Professorship, for one visiting professor of the Western College of Veterinary Medicine at the University of Saskatchewan (1978)
- K. F. Meyer Award of the American Veterinary Epidemiology Association (1979)
- Distinguished Service Award of the Wildlife Disease Association (1983)
- Arctic Science Prize of the North Slope Borough (1984)
- Honorary Doctor of the University of Saskatchewan (1985)
- Honorary Doctor of the University of Alaska Fairbanks (1987)
- Honorary Doctor of the Vetsuisse-Fakultät der Universität Zürich (1992)
- Distinguished Alumnus of the Ohio State University (1994)
- Distinguished Service Award from the American Society of Parasitologists (2001)
- Public Service Award from the American Veterinary Medical Association (2009)
- Appointment as an Eminent Parasitologist by the American Society of Parasitologists (2011)

== Taxa ==
=== Selected taxa named after Robert L. Rausch ===
- Corynosoma rauschi Golvan, 1958 (Palaeacanthocephala, Polymorphidae)
- Ceratophyllus rauschi Holland, 1960 (Siphonaptera, Ceratophyllidae)
- Acantocephalus rauschi (Schmidt, 1969) (Palaeacanthocephala, Echinorhynchidae)
- Latagophthirus rauschi Kim & Emerson, 1974 (Phthiraptera, Echinophthiriidae)
- Alcicornis rauschi Gupta & Jain, 1993 (Trematoda, Bucephalidae)
- Anoplocephaloides rauschi Genov, Georgiev & Biserkov, 1984 (Cestoda, Anoplocephalidae)

=== Selected taxa described by Robert L. Rausch ===
- Echinococcus vogeli Rausch & Bernstein, 1972 (Cestoda, Taeniidae)
- Ectopocephalium abei Rausch & Ohbayashi, 1974 (Cestoda, Anoplocephalidae)
- Schizorchis nepalensis Rausch & Smirnowa, 1984 (Cestoda, Anoplocephalidae)
- Schizorchis ryzhikovi Rausch & Smirnowa, 1984 (Cestoda, Anoplocephalidae)
- Haemodipsis brachylagi Durden & Rausch, 2007 (Phthiraptera, Polyplacidae)
- Sorex rowheri Rausch, Feagin & Rausch, 2007 (Mammalia, Soricidae)

== Selected publications ==
- Notes on the Nuamiut Eskimo and mammals of the Anaktuvuk Pass Region, Brooks Range, Alaska. In: Arctic 1951, Band 4, S. 146–196, doi:10.14430/arctic3943.
- On the ecology and distribution of Echinococcus spp. (Cestoda: Taeniidae) and characteristics of their development in the intermediate host. In: Annales de parasitologie humaine et comparée 1967, Band 42, Nr. 1, S. 19–63, doi:10.1051/parasite/1967421019.
- Trichinosis in the Arctic. In: Sylvester E. Gould (Hrsg.): Trichinosis in man and animals. Thomas, Springfield, IL 1970, S. 348–373, OCLC 01599782.

Robert L. Rausch published extensively. A more comprehensive list of his publications can be found on his Research Gate profile
