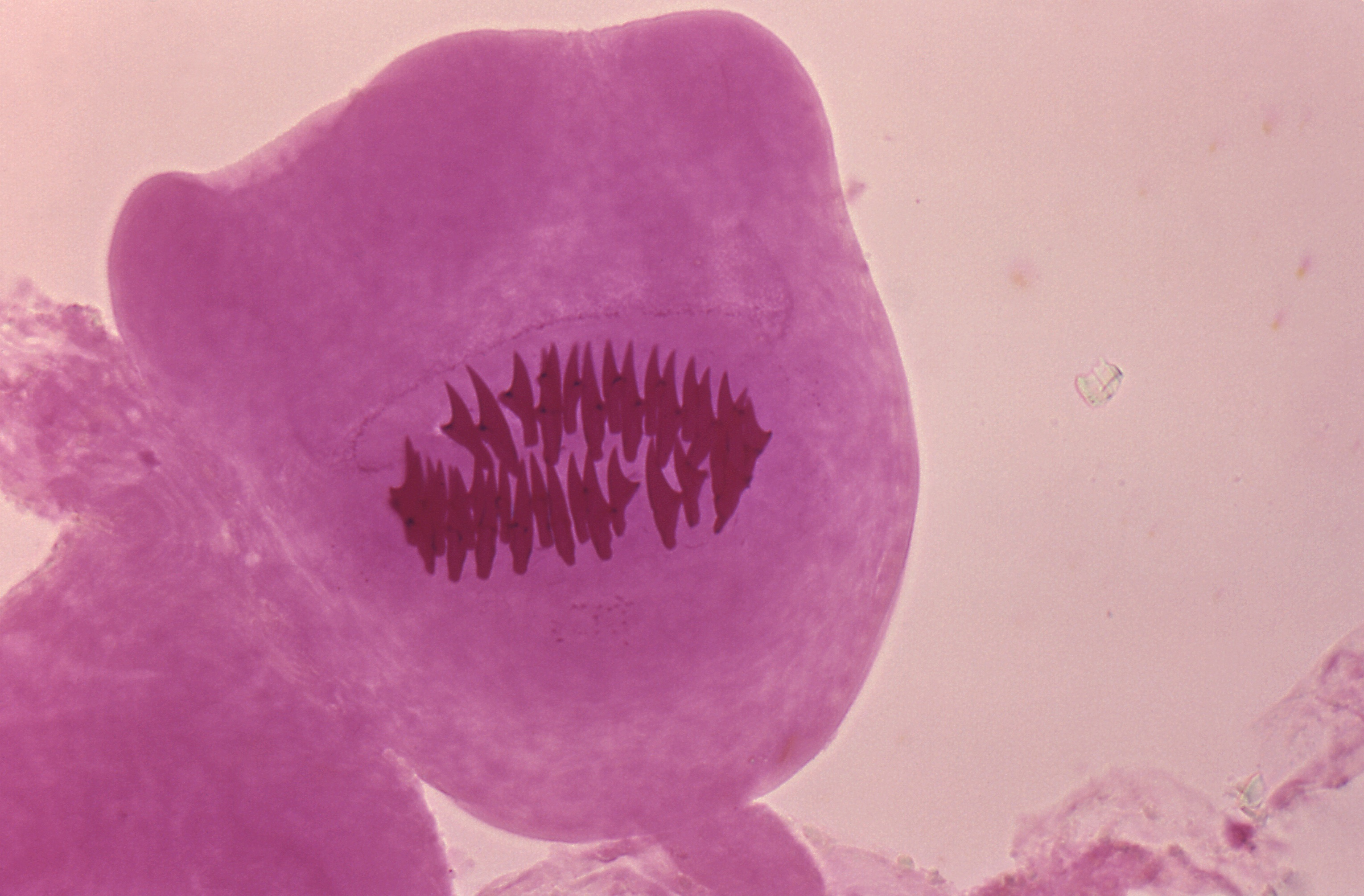
- Echinococcus vogeli protoscolex

Scientific classification
- Kingdom: Animalia
- Phylum: Platyhelminthes
- Class: Cestoda
- Order: Cyclophyllidea
- Family: Taeniidae
- Genus: Echinococcus
- Species: E. vogeli

Binomial name
- Echinococcus vogeli Rausch & Bernstein, 1972

= Echinococcus vogeli =

Species of flatworm

Echinococcus vogeli is a small cyclophyllid tapeworm found in Central and South America. E. vogeli, as well as other members of the genus Echinococcus (especially Echinococcus multilocularis), produce a disease called echinococcosis. Echinococcosis, also known has hydatidosis, is a result of ingesting the eggs of the genus Echinococcus. E. vogeli is similar to E. multilocularis in that both species produces many small cysts that spread throughout the internal organs of the infected animal. The ingestion of E. vogeli eggs, and the spreading of the cysts through infected host, will result in polycystic echinococcosis.

This parasite has a life cycle involving two mammalian hosts. Bush dogs (Speothos venaticus) and domestic dogs (Canis familiaris) are the definitive hosts, harbouring the adult stage of E. vogeli. The ingestion of a rodent intermediate host containing the hydatid cysts of the tapeworm by a bush or domestic dog often results in a heavy infestation of these tapeworms.

== Signs and symptoms ==
Human polycystic echinococcosis is the rarest type of echinococcosis and is characterized by infiltrative, multi-compartment cysts. Symptoms depend on the location of the cysts. For example, cysts located in a patient's lungs will result in shortness of breath, coughing, and/or chest pain. But, if the cysts reside in the patient's liver, symptoms will include jaundice, abnormal abdominal tenderness, abdominal pain, fever, and/or anaphylactic shock.

== Life cycle ==
The life cycle of E. vogeli utilizes a definitive host and intermediate host, also known as primary and secondary host, respectively, each housing different stages of the parasite. Bush dogs and domestic dogs serve as the definitive host for the adult stage of E. vogeli. Researchers believe that domestic dogs have a role in infecting humans with this tapeworm. The tapeworm attaches itself to the wall of the dog's small intestine via a rostellum armed with hooks. Once the tapeworm matures, eggs are released into the intestine and passed in feces. Rodents, such as the paca, serve as the intermediate host. Eggs that are eaten by the rodent form hydatid cysts in the lungs, liver, and other internal organs. When a bush or domestic dog consumes an infected rodent, the life cycle is complete. Larvae from the cysts of the infected rodent mature inside the small intestine of the dog. Humans are at risk of becoming infected when eating under cooked meat containing hydatid cysts or coming into contact with infected dog feces. But, humans are not the regular hosts of E. vogeli, meaning that humans are the dead-end host; which does not allow transmission to the definitive host.

=== Summary of life cycle ===
1. Adult tapeworm is present in the small intestine of the dog
2. Eggs are passed in the feces of the dog, which is ingested by human (dead-end host) or rodent (intermediate host)
3. Oncosphere penetrates the gut wall, and migrates to other organs via blood vessels
4. Hydatid cysts form in the organs of the rodent
5. Infected rodent is eaten by a dog, transferring protoscolices into the definitive host
6. Ingested protoscolices attach themselves to the wall of the small intestine and develop into mature strobila

== Morphology ==
Echinococcus vogeli has the largest strobila within the Echinococcus genus, reaching a length of 12 mm. This tapeworm resides in the small intestine of bush and domestic dogs. E. vogeli contains a scolex, where a hook-filled rostellum is located, and a long neck that attaches to up to six proglottids. The gravid proglottid, the sexually mature proglottid that releases eggs into the dog's feces, is cylindrical and takes up about half of the strobilar length.

== Diagnosis ==
The diagnosis of polycystic echinococcosis involves isolating the protoscolices during surgery or after the patient's death in order to identify E. vogeli. Imaging, such as ultrasound and CT scans, can also be used to identify polycystic structures, but this method is not preferred as images are similar to other types of echinococcosis and liver cancer. New studies show that PCR may identify E. vogeli in the patient's tissues. Microscopic examination of hooklet morphology within the contents of protoscolices distinguishes Echinococcus species, and two sizes of hooklets are typically present.

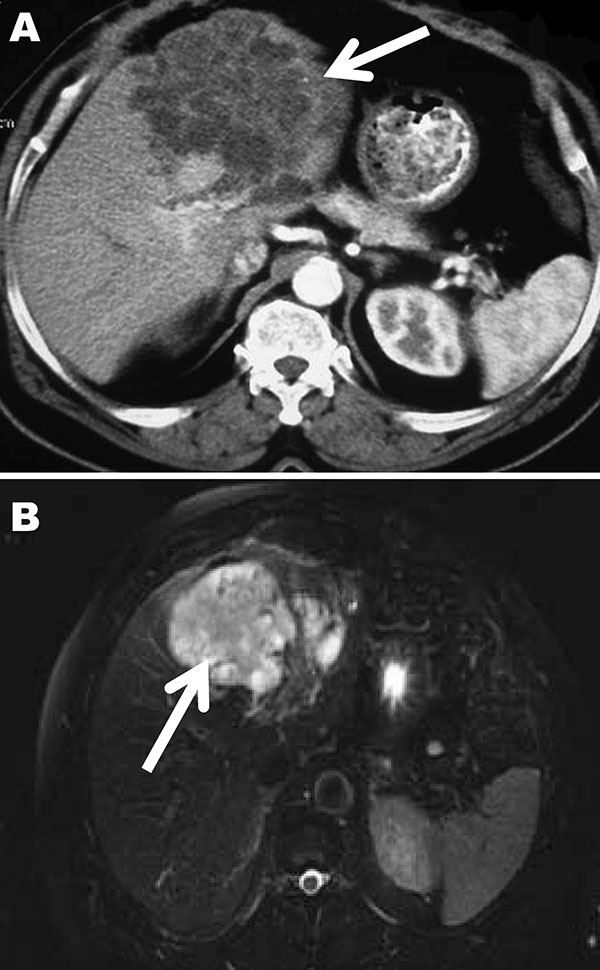
Polycystic echinococcosis affecting the left side of the liver

== Disease staging ==
Polycystic echinococcosis (PE) is an extremely lethal helminthic disease in humans, which is caused by the larval form of E. vogeli. Type I PE consists of polycystic masses in the liver and abdominal cavity. Type II also has polycystic masses in the liver and abdominal cavity, but includes hepatic insufficiency. Type III has polycystic masses in the liver and chest cavity. In type IV polycystic masses occur only in the mesenteries. Type V has calcified cysts in the liver and lung. Type II seems to have the highest mortality rate due to the complications involved with hepatic insufficiency. Due to the similarities between liver cancer and polycystic echinococcosis, PE is hard to diagnose and could be deadly when metastasized to other organs.

== Treatment ==
If patients do not undergo treatment, 94% of them will die within 20 years of diagnosis. PE is treated the same as cystic echinococcosis, with mebendazole and albendazole showing definite progress in treating PE. Surgery remains the top treatment against PE. There are less invasive surgical methods partnered with chemotherapy in development.

== Epidemiology ==
The parasite E. vogeli resides in neotropical areas, such as Central and South America. Polycystic echinococcosis has infected people in Panama, Colombia, Ecuador, Venezuela, Peru, Brazil, and Suriname. E. vogeli infections seem to be on the rise, with 100 new cases over the past 10 years.
