= Calum N. L. Macpherson =

British parasitologist

Calum MacPherson
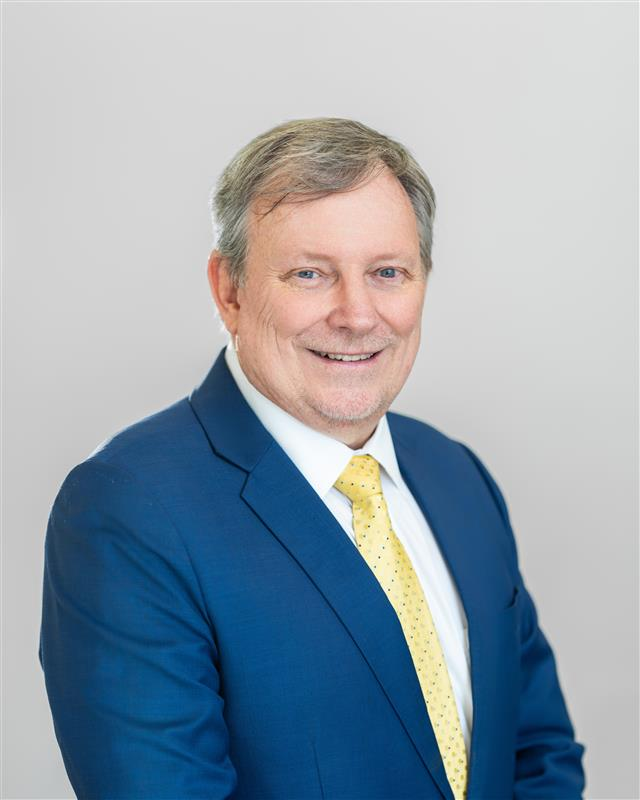
- Born: 1955 (age 70–71)
- Education: Imperial College London; University of Sheffield
- Occupations: Parasitologist; public health researcher
- Known for: diagnosis and treatment of Echinococcosis

Calum Norman Lindsay Macpherson is a British public health academic whose work focuses on the human impact of zoonotic diseases and the epidemiology of parasitic infections. He is a professor at St. George’s University in Grenada where he holds senior leadership roles in research and graduate education.

== Early life and education ==
Born in Nairobi, Kenya in 1955 he attended Zoology at Sheffield University in 1978, and completed his PhD in parasitology at Imperial College London in 1981, where he was also awarded the Diploma of Imperial College (DIC).

== Career ==
Macpherson worked with the African Medical and Research Foundation (AMREF) in Kenya, where he served as field project leader for the National Control Programme on Cystic Echinococcus, in Turkana. He subsequently joined the Swiss Tropical Institute, in its Ifakara Field Laboratory at Tanzania, and later became its director. There he was responsible for programmes in malaria vaccines, nutrition and immunity, schistosomiasis, onchocerciasis and other neglected tropical diseases. After a brief period at the Liverpool School of Tropical Medicine, Macpherson moved in 1991 to the University of the West Indies at Trindad as Professor of Veterinary Parasitology. In 1993 he joined St. George’s University (SGU) in Grenada, where he has held posts including Director of Research and Dean of the School of Graduate Studies. He is also founding director and a vice president of the Windward Islands Research and Education Foundation (WINDREF) at the SGU.

He is known to have first used Ultrasonography for the diagnosis of Hydatid Disease and portable ultrasound scanners to diagnose alveolar echinococcus.

== Research ==
Macpherson’s has published more than 150 peer‑reviewed articles and contributed to or edited several books and book chapters on zoonotic diseases. His work includes research on hydatid disease and other helminth infections, zoonotic parasites of dogs, the “One Health” interface between humans, animals and the environment, and emerging infections such as arboviral diseases and coronavirus infections in companion animals. He has also been involved in implementation studies and projects of environmental issues, such as wastewater treatment and recycling, and coastal protection.

Macpherson is co‑editor of the book Dogs, Zoonoses and Public Health, which examines the role of dogs in the transmission and control of zoonotic infections. Among his widely cited journal papers is “Human behaviour and the epidemiology of parasitic zoonoses” in the International Journal of Parasitology, which discusses how behavioural factors shape the transmission of parasitic zoonotic diseases.

== Professional affiliations and service ==
Macpherson is a Fellow of the Royal Society for Public Health (FRSPH), a Fellow of the Royal Society of Biology (FSB), and a Fellow of the Royal Society of Tropical Medicine and Hygiene (FRSTMH). He has served on advisory and expert committees for organizations such as the World Health Organization and the Pan American Health Organization, and is a member of the Research Advisory Committee of the Caribbean Public Health Agency (CARPHA). He has served on WHO committee(1994-2003) charged with developing International classification of ultrasound images in cystic echinococcosis, to help standardizing treatment options for different cyst types.

He holds or has held adjunct or cooperating positions with universities and institutes in Kenya, Asia, and the Caribbean, and he has participated in leadership bodies such as the Global Virus Network.
