= Alveolar hydatid disease =

Aveolar Hydatid Disease
- Other names: Alveolar echinococcosis Alveolar colloid of the liver, Alveolococcosis, Multilocular echinococcosis
- Specialty: Infectious diseases, helminthologist
- Causes: infection of larval stage Echinococcus multilocularis

Alveolar hydatid disease (AHD) is a form of echinococcosis, or a disease that originates from a parasitic flatworm. AHD is caused by an infection of the flatworm species Echinococcus multilocularis. Although alveolar echinococcosis is rarely diagnosed in humans and is not as widespread as cystic echinococcosis (caused by Echinococcus granulosus), it is also still a serious disease that has a significantly high fatality rate. It is considered one of the most life-threatening helminthic infections humans can have.

It is most prevalent in China, Eastern France, Switzerland, Austria, Bulgaria, Turkey, Iran, Japan, Afghanistan, and Russia, and is mostly confined to the Northern hemisphere, south to around the 40th or 45th degree of Northern latitude, save some cases reported in Northern Africa.

== Signs and symptoms ==
As the larvae grow in the liver, they create lesions. If untreated, this progresses into abdominal mass and/or pain, jaundice, and finally liver failure.

== Cause ==
AHD is caused by the larval stage of E. mulitilocularis, a species of flatworm found in the Northern Hemisphere. Humans make poor intermediate hosts for the worm, as they play no role in their life cycle. However, when exposed the worms will still infect them. A major risk factor is when their domesticated dogs and cats eat wild, infected (typically arvicolid) rodents. Their feces then will contain the worms' eggs, which have fully developed larval worms inside. Humans become infected after eating food or water contaminated by embryonated eggs, or by handling an infected host like dogs and cats or by skinning infected foxes.

== Pathophysiology ==
Once ingested by humans, "the oncospheres hatch in the stomach or small intestine, become activated, penetrate the epithelial layer, and migrate via blood and lymphatic vessels to the visceral organs, primarily the liver, where they develop to another larval stage, the metacestode." The larval growth resembles a slow-moving liver tumor and it is able to destroy both the liver parenchyma and its function.

== Diagnosis ==
Due to its infiltration into biliary and vascular liver tissue, it can be difficult to differentiate AHD and liver cancer.

== Management ==
Early detection and treatment and radical surgery is key to preventing fatality from AHD. Treatment may include liver resection to remove the larvae and chemotherapy using benzimidazoles. Chemotherapy must continue for many years, sometimes for the remainder of the patient's life. Failure to comply with these expensive and difficult treatments will likely result in death for the patient.

== Prognosis ==
The disease is often progressive and destructive. The growth happens slowly, and so many people do not get symptoms until the later stages. Central necrotic cavities are common in advanced stages of the disease.

== Epidemiology ==
AHD is not as common as diseases caused by other flatworms, but it is still prevalent in the Northern hemisphere. It is not uncommon in China, with some communities having a 5% or more infection rate. In Europe, it is considered an emerging disease. The increasing fox populations of Europe correlate with heightened reported cases.

== History ==
In 1855, Rudolf Virchow, the German pathologist, recognized that the disorder that was at the time known as colloid carcinoma of the liver, which was known for its tumor-like lesions in the liver, were actually caused by an Echinococcus species. For the next 100 years, it was debated whether the species was E. granulosus or a different species. It was finally settled by two publications between 1954 and 1955, the former from Alaska and the latter from Germany.

== Society and culture ==
AHD is confined to the Northern hemisphere. There are about 18,235 reported cases every year with 95% hailing from China.

== Research directions ==
Wildlife research is working to detect the parasite in new areas.
