= PAIR (puncture-aspiration-injection-reaspiration) =

Medical intervention

The PAIR (puncture-aspiration-injection-reaspiration; sometimes percutaneous aspiration-injection-reaspiration) procedure is a noninvasive treatment option to remove hydatid cysts. PAIR is considered an alternative treatment for cystic echinococcosis (hydatid disease) and is often indicated for patients who do not respond to surgery or benzimidazoles

The PAIR procedure can be performed as follows:

1. ultrasound-guided percutaneous puncture of the cyst
2. aspiration of cystic fluid
3. injection of a scolicidal solution
4. reaspiration of the solution
