= Ceratophyllus rauschi =

Scientific classification
- Domain: Eukaryota
- Kingdom: Animalia
- Phylum: Arthropoda
- Class: Insecta
- Order: Siphonaptera
- Family: Ceratophyllidae
- Genus: Ceratophyllus
- Species: C. rauschi

Binomial name
- Ceratophyllus rauschi Holland, 1960

Species of flea

Ceratophyllus rauschi is a species of flea in the family Ceratophyllidae. It was described by George P. Holland in 1960, who chose the name of the species to honour the American parasitologist Robert L. Rausch.
