= Metacestode =

Larval tapeworm

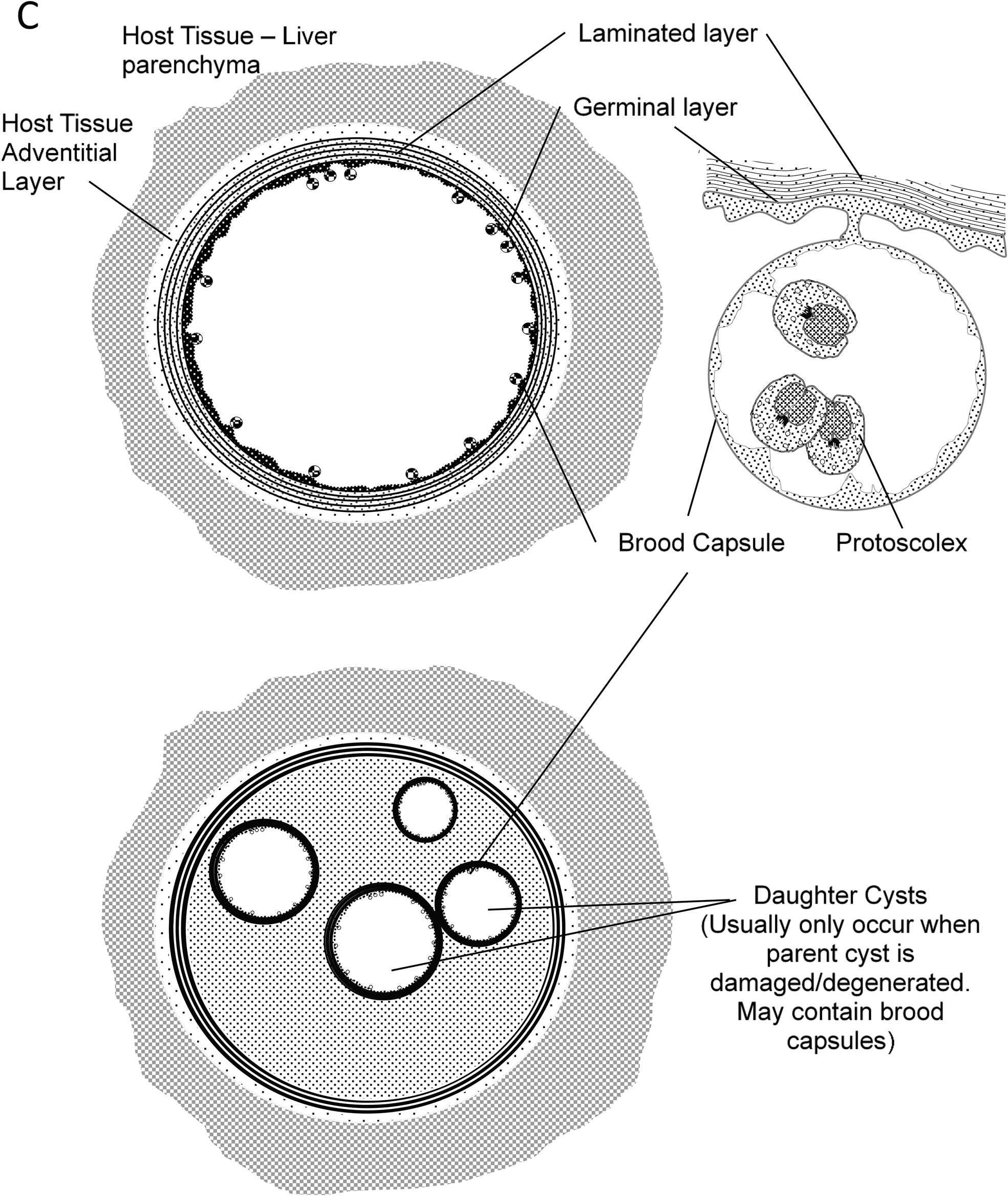
The metacestode of the cestode Echinococcus spp.

A metacestode is the larval stage of a tapeworm, found in an intermediate host. It can take various forms, for example, the hydatid cyst, strobilocercus, cysticercus or cysticercoid.

== See also ==
- Plerocercoid
