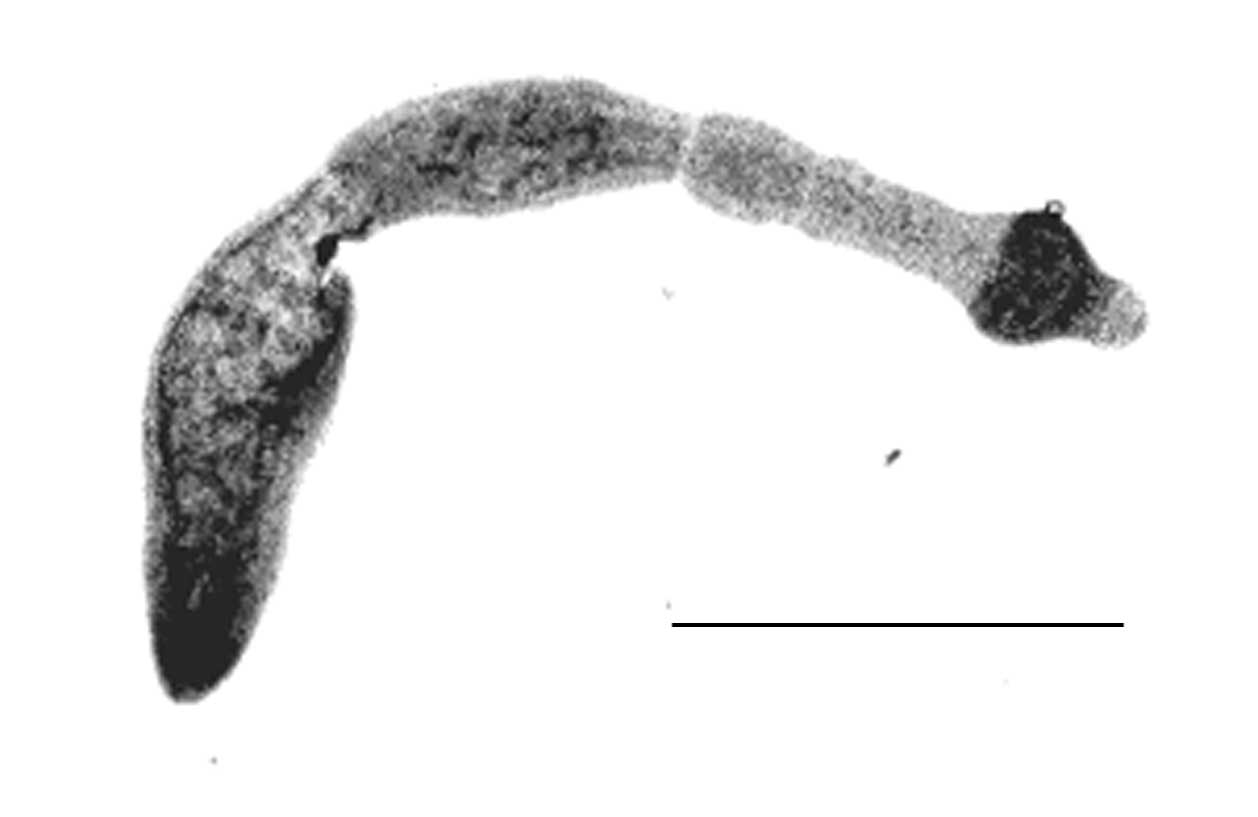
- Echinococcus multilocularis isolated from a fox

Scientific classification
- Kingdom: Animalia
- Phylum: Platyhelminthes
- Class: Cestoda
- Order: Cyclophyllidea
- Family: Taeniidae
- Genus: Echinococcus
- Species: E. multilocularis

Binomial name
- Echinococcus multilocularis Leuckart, 1863

Synonyms
- Echinococcus sibiricensis Rausch & Schiller 1954 (Vogel 1957); Alveococcus multilocularis Lukashenko 1968; Echinococcus russicensis Tang et al 2007 (Nakao et al 2009, Ito et al 2010)

= Echinococcus multilocularis =

Species of flatworm

Echinococcus multilocularis, the fox tapeworm, is a small cyclophyllid tapeworm found extensively in the northern hemisphere. E. multilocularis, along with other members of the Echinococcus genus (especially E. granulosus), produce diseases known as echinococcosis. Unlike E. granulosus, E. multilocularis produces many small cysts (also referred to as locules) that spread throughout the internal organs of the infected animal. The resultant disease is called alveolar echinococcosis, and is caused by ingesting the eggs of E. multilocularis.

The parasite is commonly maintained in a wildlife life cycle involving two mammalian hosts. Wild canids, dogs, and less commonly cats act as definitive hosts, harbouring the adult stage of the tape worm. Voles are the intermediate hosts. Ingestion of a rodent containing alveolar hydatid cysts by a wild canid can result in a heavy infestation of tapeworms.

== Signs and symptoms ==
Human alveolar echinococcosis is characterized by a lengthy incubation period of 5 to 15 years in immunocompetent individuals. The progression of disease is potentiated in immunocompromised patients. Following the ingestion of the eggs of E. multilocularis, the metacestode (larval) stage of the parasite typically embeds in the liver. As the disease progresses, the larval stage proliferates exogenously within the tissue, behaving similar to hepatic neoplasia. Patients with human alveolar echinococcosis typically present with headache, nausea, vomiting, abdominal pain. Jaundice is rare, but hepatomegaly is a common physical finding.

== Life cycle ==
The life cycle of E. multilocularis involves a primary or definitive host and a secondary or intermediate host, each harboring different life stages of the parasite.

Foxes, coyotes, domestic dogs, and other canids are the definitive hosts for the adult stage of the parasite. Cats may also be involved. The head of the tapeworm attaches to the intestinal mucosa by hooks and suckers. It then produces hundreds of microscopic eggs, which are dispersed through the feces.

Voles are the intermediate host. Beavers may also be affected; and reintroduction of beavers from affected areas is a cause for concern. Eggs ingested by rodents develop in the liver, lungs and other organs to form multilocular cysts. The life cycle is completed after a fox or canine consumes a rodent infected with cysts. Larvae within the cyst develop into adult tapeworms in the intestinal tract of the definitive host.

Humans can become an aberrant intermediate host by accidentally ingesting eggs of E. multilocularis when handling infected animals or consuming contaminated food, vegetable, and water. Except in rare cases where infected humans are eaten by canines, humans are a dead-end or incidental host (an aberrant intermediate host that does not allow transmission to the definitive host) for E. multilocularis.

Summary of the life cycle

1. adult worm present in intestine of definitive host
2. eggs passed in feces, ingested by humans or intermediate host
3. onchosphere penetrates intestinal wall, carried via blood vessels to lodge in organs
4. hydatid cysts develop in liver, lungs, brain, heart
5. protoscolices (hydatid sand) ingested by definitive host
6. ingested protoscolices attach to small intestine and develops into adult worm

== Morphology ==
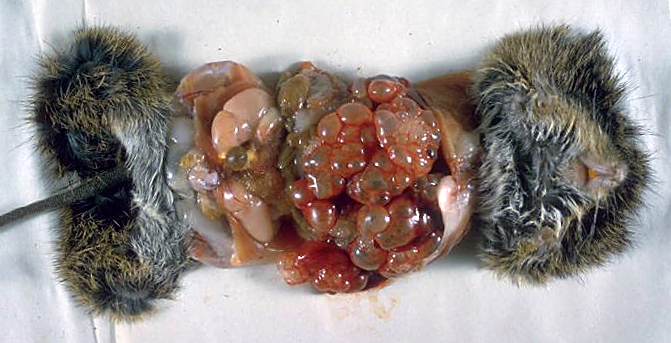
Cotton rat infected with Echinococcus multilocularis

The adult parasite is a small tapeworm that is 3-6 mm long, and lives in the small intestine of canines. The segmented worm contains a scolex with suckers and hooks that enable attachment to the mucosal wall, since tapeworms do not have a digestive tract. A short neck connects the head to three proglottids, the body segment of the worm which contains the eggs to be excreted in the feces.

== Diagnosis ==
Serological and imaging tests are commonly used to diagnose this disease. Since the serological tests for alveolar echinococcosis only indicate exposure to the parasite and not ongoing infection, visualization of the parasitic mass is required to confirm the diagnosis. Frequently used serological tests include antibody tests, ELISA and indirect hemagglutination (IHA). An intradermal allergic reaction test (Casoni test) has also been used to diagnose patients. Imaging tests include: X-rays, CT scans, MRI, and ultrasound. Histology is another important diagnostic tool to use. In the past, the PAS staining technique has proven beneficial in helping determine if infections are caused by Echinococcus multiocularis. More recently, a new immunohistochemistry technique that uses a monoclonal antibody (Em2G11) has provided professionals with more accuracy and precision in diagnosing Echinococcus multiocularis and distinguishing it from other species like Echinococcus granulosus.

== Disease staging ==
Alveolar echinococcosis (AE) is a highly lethal helminthic disease in humans, caused by the larval form of the parasitic tapeworm E. multilocularis. The disease represents a serious public threat in China, Siberia, and central Europe. However, since the 1990s, the prevalence of the disease seems to be increasing in Europe, not only in the historically endemic areas but its neighboring regions. AE primarily affects the liver by inducing a hepatic disorder similar to liver cancer, therefore becoming extremely dangerous and difficult to diagnose. If the infection metastasizes, it may spread to any other organ and could be lethal if not treated. The most common treatment for AE is to surgically remove the parasite. Since it is difficult and not always possible to remove the entire parasite, medicine such as Albendazole is utilized to keep the cyst from growing back.

Guided by the Tumor-Node-Metastasis (TNM) system of liver cancer, the European Network for Concerted Surveillance of Alveolar Echinococcosis and the World Health Organization Informal Working Group on Echinococcosis, a clinical classification system has been proposed. This classification system has been designated as the "PNM" system (P = parasitic mass, N = involvement of neighboring organs, M = metastasis). The system was developed by a retrospective analysis of records from 97 patients treated in France and Germany (2 treatment centers). Amongst other characteristics, the system takes into consideration the localization of the parasite in the liver, the extent of lesion involvement, regional involvement, and metastasis.

== Treatment ==
If no specific therapy is initiated, in 94% of patients the disease is fatal within 10–20 years following diagnosis.

- Currently, benzimidazoles (such as albendazole) are used to treat AE. These only halt their proliferation and do not actually kill the parasites, side effects of treatment include liver damage.
- 2-Methoxyestradiol (2-ME2), a natural metabolite of estradiol, is tested with some results in vitro: decreased transcription of 14-3-3-pro-tumorogenic zeta-isoform, causes damage to germinal layer but does not kill parasite in vivo.
- Treatment with a combination of albendazole/2-ME2 showed best results in reducing parasite burden
- Despite the improvements in the chemotherapy of echinococcosis with benzimidazole derivatives, complete elimination of the parasitic mass cannot be achieved in most infected patients, although studies indicate that long-term treatment with mebendazole typically increases the survival rate.

== Epidemiology ==
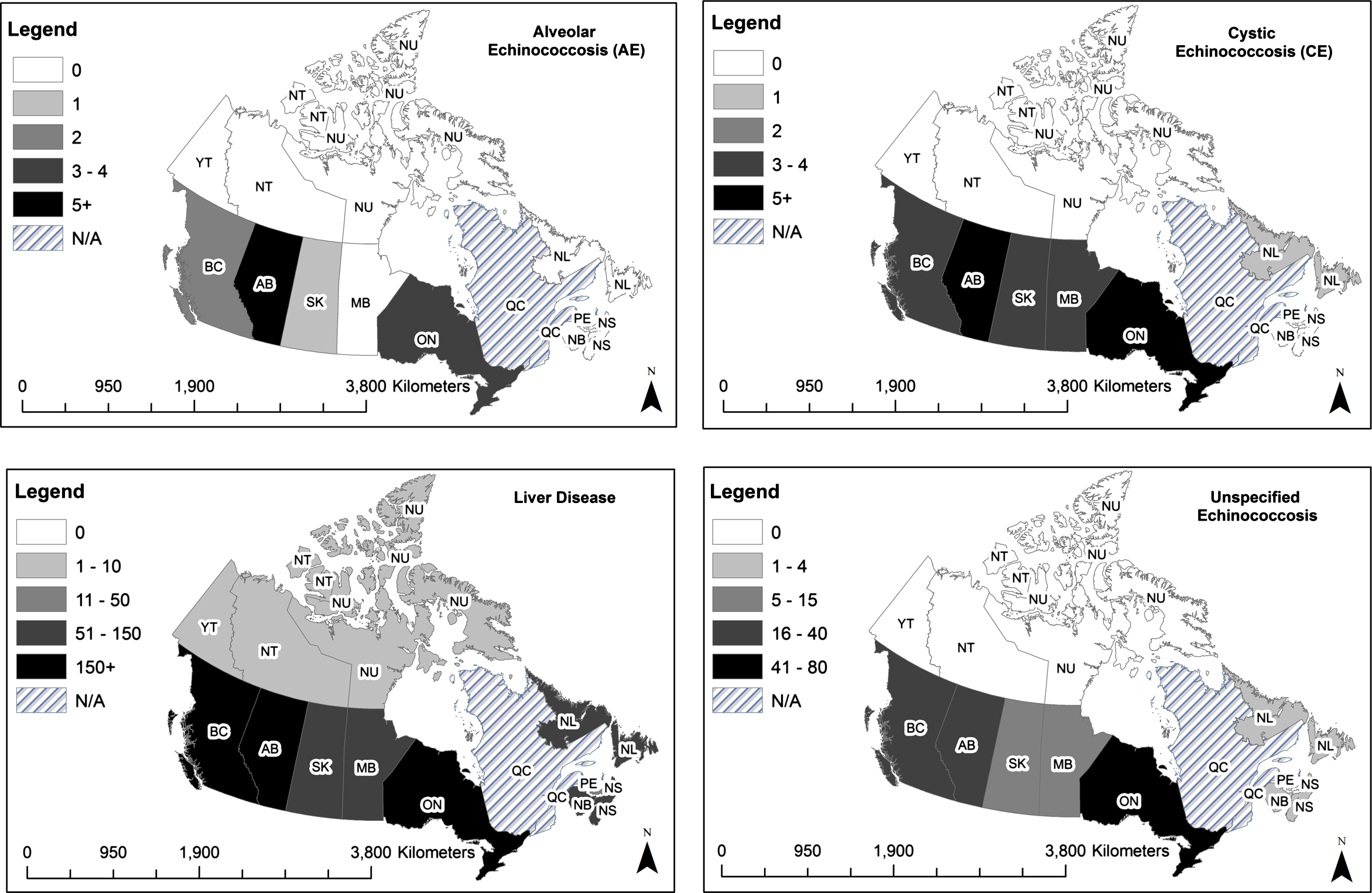
Epidemiology of Echinococcus multilocularis in Canada

The incidence of human infestation with E. multilocularis and disease is increasing in urban areas, as wild foxes (an important reservoir species of the sylvatic cycle) are migrating to urban and suburban areas and gaining closer contact with human populations. Also, restocking fox enclosures for fox hunting with infected animals spreads the disease. Children, health care workers and domestic animals are at risk of ingesting the eggs after coming into contact with the feces of infected wild foxes. Even with the improvement of health in developed/industrialized countries, the prevalence of alveolar echinococcosis (AE) did not decrease. On the contrary, incidents of AE have now also been registered in eastern European countries and sporadic incidences in other European countries.

The disease has extended its range in Europe in the last few decades. Still the infection is fairly rare. Between 1982 and 2000 a total of 559 cases were reported throughout Europe.

Recent findings indicate that E. multilocularis is likely expanding its range in the central region of the United States and Canada and that invasions of European strains might have occurred; the endemic presence of the parasite in urban areas and a total of 16 human cases in Alberta, Canada have been reported. The first human case in Alberta was diagnosed in 2013. In one case, the infection caused a grapefruit sized tumour in the lung, kidney and diaphragm, which had to be surgically removed. Because of the significant difficulty in diagnosing an infection caused by Echinococcus multiocularis, it is suspected that this parasite is often misdiagnosed. Several studies that have been done since the 1950s in North America indicate a higher prevalence of Echinococcus multiocularis than previously thought. However, due to limited knowledge about the parasite, it is often not monitored in wild or domestic animals; this monitoring will become crucial to the control of the parasite in the future as it continues to spread.

== See also ==
- Alveolar hydatid disease
- List of parasites (human)
