= Oncosphere =

Stage of development of a tapeworm

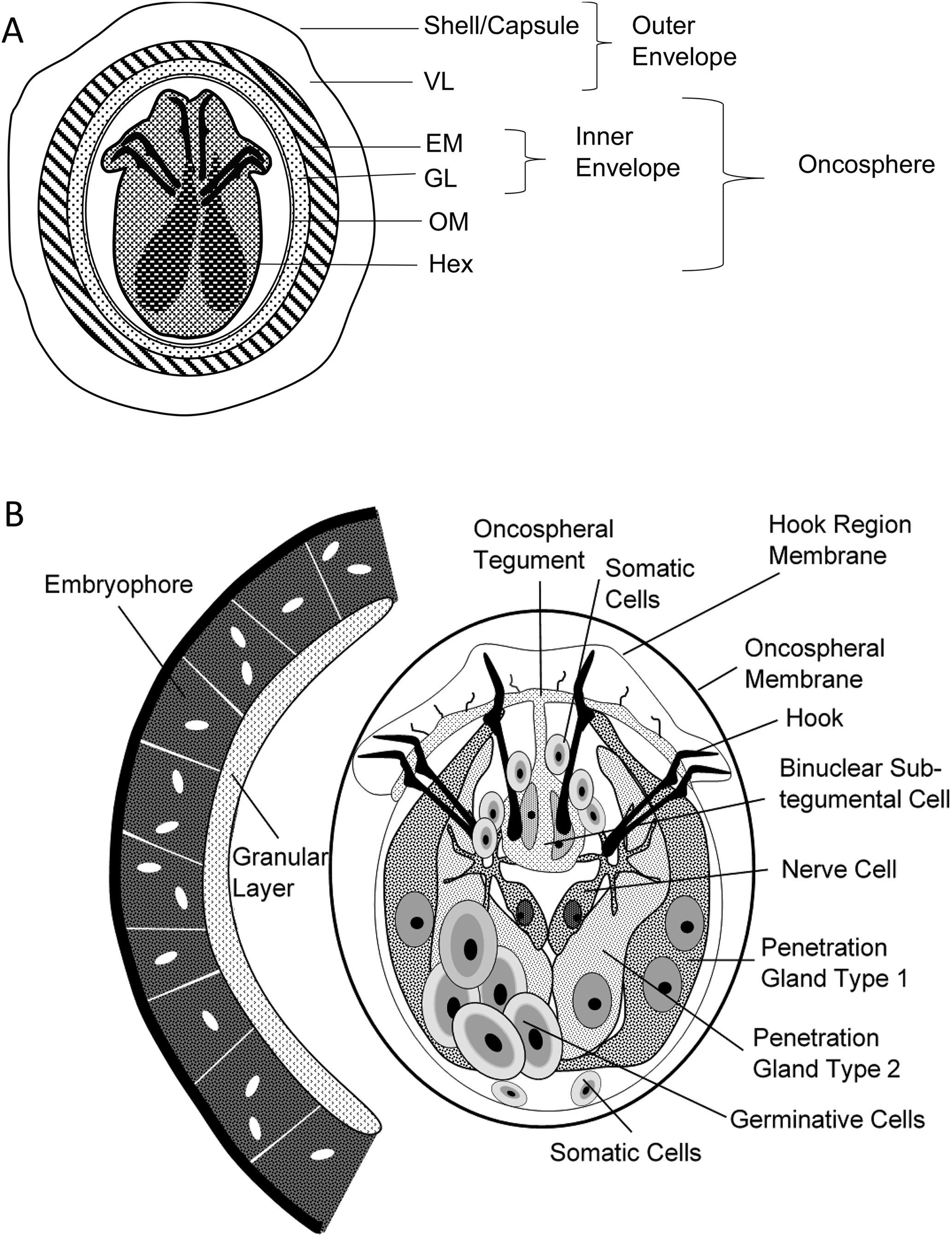
General description of the egg and oncosphere of Echinococcus spp.

An oncosphere is the larval form of a tapeworm once it has been ingested by an intermediate host animal. The intermediate host must ingest the tapeworm's eggs either in food or water – once this has happened, the eggs hatch and develop into oncospheres which will then burrow through the gut wall of the intermediate host in order to access the organs or tissues of that host where they will continue the next stage of their development as cysticerci or bladderworms. The bladderworm is a cyst created by the oncosphere. In order to become an adult tapeworm, a cysticercus must then be consumed by its definitive host (in either raw or undercooked meat) and establish itself by anchoring in that host's digestive tract. From there, the worm will grow in length and eventually produce proglottids which will exit the intestinal tract with other waste material and then burst, releasing the worm's eggs and completing the cycle.

== See also ==
- Hexacanth
