= Helminthiasis =

Any macroparasitic disease caused by helminths

- Other names: Worm infection, helminthosis, helminthiases, helminth infection
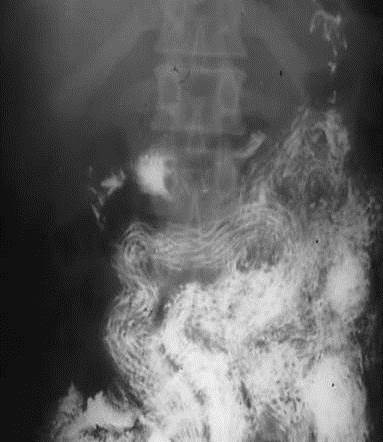
- Ascaris worms (one type of helminth) in the small bowel of an infected person (X-ray image with barium as contrast medium)
- Pronunciation: /ˌhɛlmɪnˈθaɪəsɪs/
- Specialty: Infectious diseases

Helminthiasis, also known as worm infection, is any macroparasitic disease of humans and other animals in which a part of the body is infected with parasitic worms, known as helminths. There are numerous species of these parasites, which are broadly classified into tapeworms, flukes, and roundworms. They often live in the gastrointestinal tract of their hosts, but they may also burrow into other organs, where they induce physiological damage.

Soil-transmitted helminthiasis and schistosomiasis are the most important helminthiases, and are among the neglected tropical diseases. These group of helminthiases have been targeted under the joint action of the world's leading pharmaceutical companies and non-governmental organizations through a project launched in 2012 called the London Declaration on Neglected Tropical Diseases, which aimed to control or eradicate certain neglected tropical diseases by 2020.

Helminthiasis has been found to result in poor birth outcome, poor cognitive development, poor school and work performance, poor socioeconomic development, and poverty. Chronic illness, malnutrition, and anemia are further examples of secondary effects.

Soil-transmitted helminthiases are responsible for parasitic infections in as much as a quarter of the human population worldwide. One well-known example of soil-transmitted helminthiases is ascariasis.

== Types of parasitic helminths ==
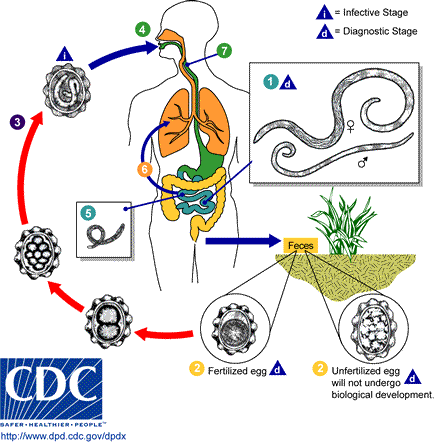
Ascaris life cycle: Adult worms in the lumen of the small intestine (1). The female produces eggs (approximately 200,000 per day) that are excreted with the feces (2). Unfertilized eggs are harmless, but fertilized ones are infective after 18 days to several weeks (3). Infective eggs are ingested (4), enter the gut (5), develop into larvae in the intestine, and penetrate the blood vessel to enter lungs, where they develop further (6), after 10 to 14 days, penetrate the alveolar walls, ascend the bronchial tree to the throat, and are re-swallowed (7). Upon reaching the small intestine, they develop into adult worms (8). It takes 2 to 3 months for one complete cycle. Adult worms can live 1 to 2 years.

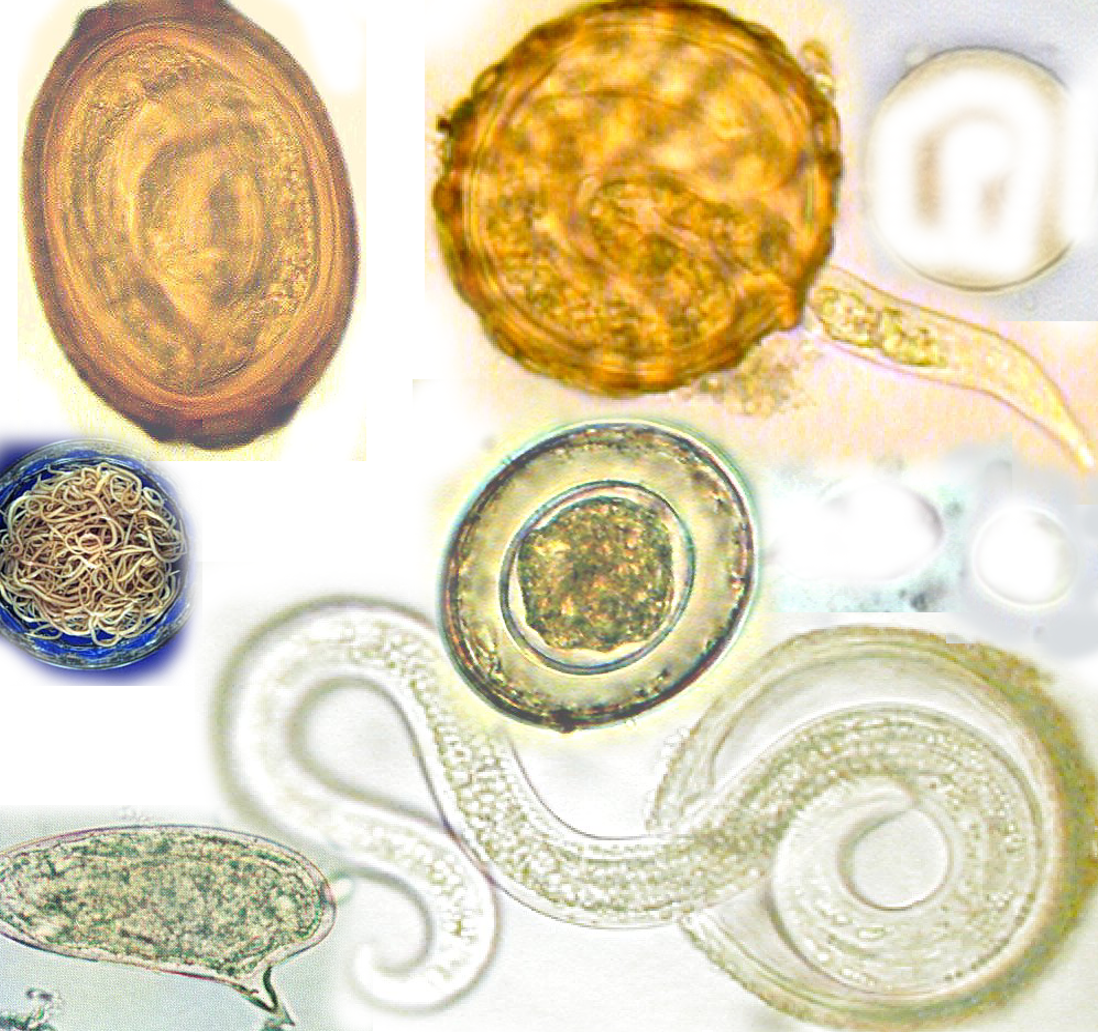
Collage of various helminth eggs, from left to right: Trichosomoides egg, Ascaris lumbricoides with larva hatching, sample of adult roundworms, Hymenolepis nana, Schistosoma mansoni and Toxocara canis with larva hatching

Of all the known helminth species, the most important helminths with respect to understanding their transmission pathways, their control, inactivation and enumeration in samples of human excreta from dried feces, faecal sludge, wastewater, and sewage sludge are:

- soil-transmitted helminths, including Ascaris lumbricoides (the most common worldwide), Trichuris trichiura, Necator americanus, Strongyloides stercoralis and Ancylostoma duodenale
- Hymenolepis nana
- Taenia saginata
- Enterobius
- Fasciola hepatica
- Schistosoma mansoni
- Toxocara canis
- Toxocara cati

Helminthiases are classified as follows (the disease names end with "-sis" and the causative worms are in brackets):

=== Roundworm infection (nematodiasis) ===
- Filariasis (filarial worms: Wuchereria bancrofti, Brugia malayi infection)
  - Onchocerciasis (Onchocerca volvulus infection)
- Soil-transmitted helminthiasis – this includes ascariasis (Ascaris lumbricoides infection), trichuriasis (Trichuris infection), and hookworm infection (includes necatoriasis and Ancylostoma duodenale infection)
- Trichostrongyliasis (Trichostrongylus spp. infection)
- Dracunculiasis (guinea worm infection)
- Baylisascaris (raccoon roundworm, may be transmitted to pets, livestock, and humans)

=== Tapeworm infection (cestodiasis) ===
- Echinococcosis (Echinococcus infection)
- Hymenolepiasis (Hymenolepis infection)
- Taeniasis/cysticercosis (Taenia infection)
- Coenurosis (T. multiceps, T. serialis, T. glomerata, and T. brauni infection)

=== Trematode infection (trematodiasis) ===
- Amphistomiasis (amphistomes infection)
- Clonorchiasis (Clonorchis sinensis infection)
- Fascioliasis (Fasciola infection)
- Fasciolopsiasis (Fasciolopsis buski infection)
- Opisthorchiasis (Opisthorchis infection)
- Paragonimiasis (Paragonimus infection)
- Schistosomiasis/bilharziasis (Schistosoma infection)

=== Acanthocephala infection ===
- Moniliformis infection

== Signs and symptoms ==
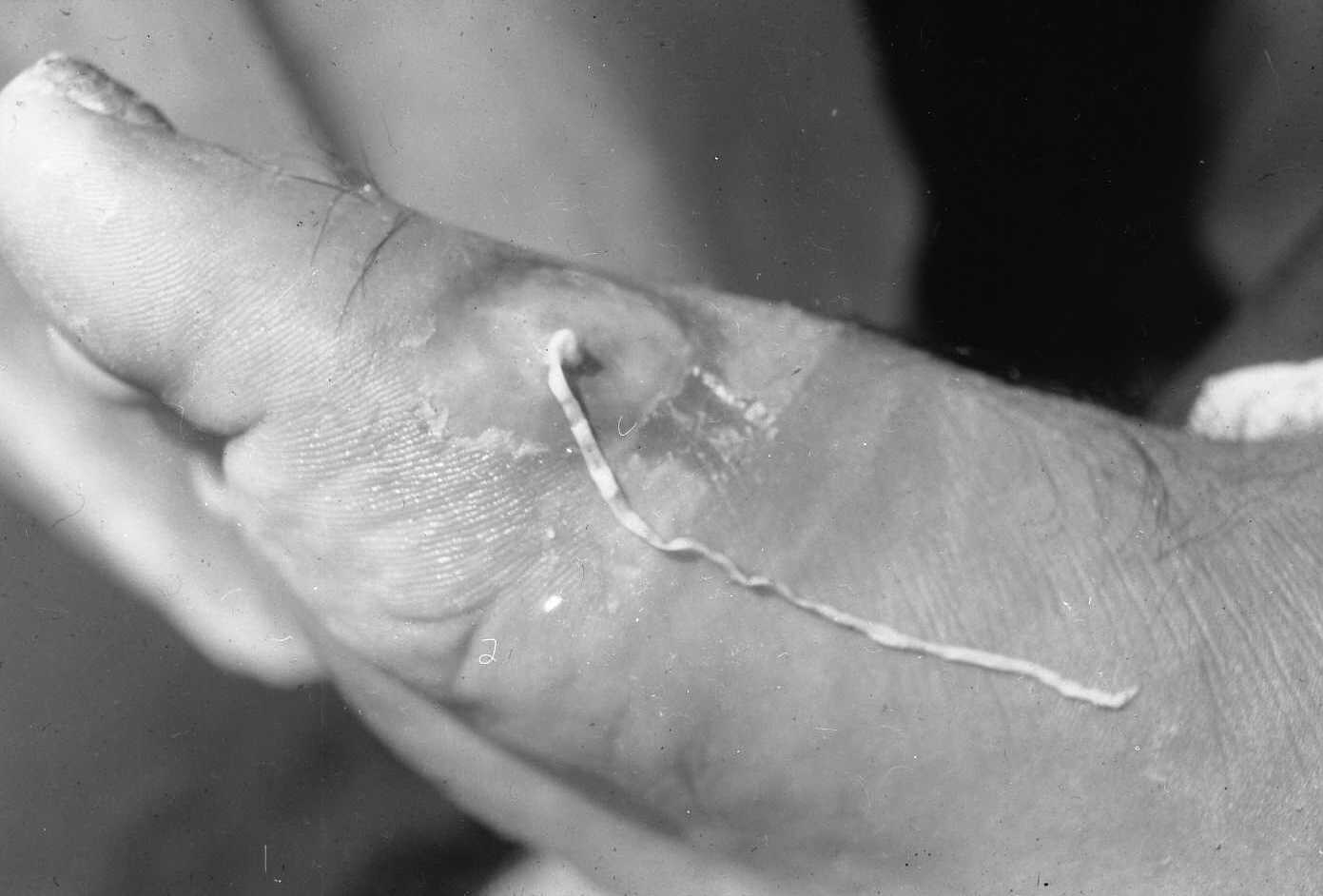
Example clinical photo: Guinea worm infection (dracunculiasis), worm coming out of the foot of an infected person.

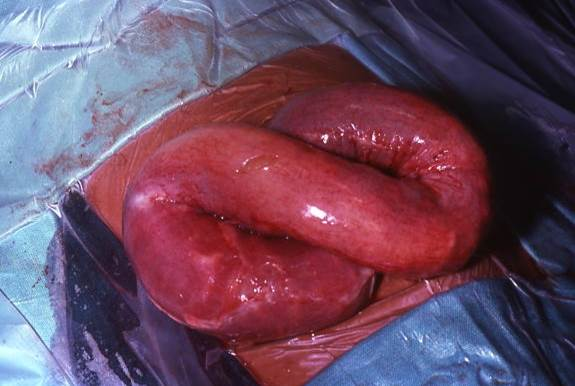
Ascaris infection: Antimesenteric splitting of the outer layers of the bowel wall due to a large amount of ascaris (South Africa)

The signs and symptoms of helminthiasis depend on a number of factors including: the site of the infestation within the body; the type of worm involved; the number of worms and their volume; the type of damage the infesting worms cause; and, the immunological response of the body. Where the burden of parasites in the body is light, there may be no symptoms.

Certain worms may cause particular constellations of symptoms. For instance, taeniasis can lead to seizures due to neurocysticercosis.

=== Mass and volume ===
In extreme cases of intestinal infestation, the mass and volume of the worms may cause the outer layers of the intestinal wall, such as the muscular layer, to tear. This may lead to peritonitis, volvulus, and gangrene of the intestine.

=== Immunological response ===
As pathogens in the body, helminths induce an immune response. Immune-mediated inflammatory changes occur in the skin, lung, liver, intestine, central nervous system, and eyes. Signs of the body's immune response may include eosinophilia, edema, and arthritis. An example of the immune response is the hypersensitivity reaction that may lead to anaphylaxis. Another example is the migration of Ascaris larvae through the bronchi of the lungs causing asthma.

=== Secondary effects ===
==== Immune changes ====
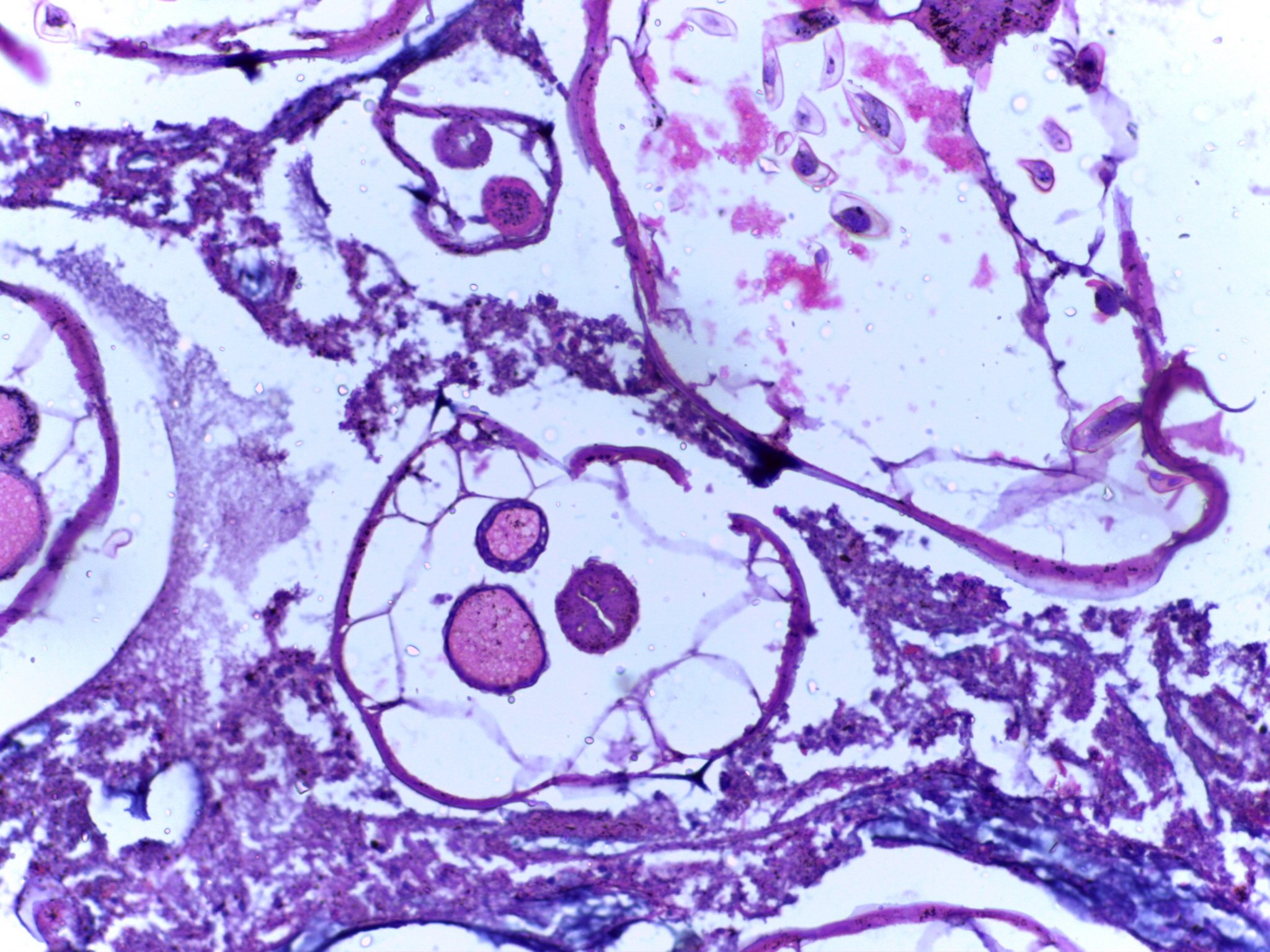
Micrograph of cut section of human appendix showing a pin worm.

In humans, T helper cells and eosinophils respond to helminth infestation. It is well established that T helper 2 cells are the central players of protective immunity to helminths, while the roles for B cells and antibodies are context-dependent. Inflammation leads to encapsulation of egg deposits throughout the body. Helminths excrete into the intestine toxic substances after they feed. These substances then enter the circulatory and lymphatic systems of the host body.

Chronic immune responses to helminthiasis may lead to increased susceptibility to other infections such as tuberculosis, HIV, and malaria. There is conflicting information about whether deworming reduces HIV progression and viral load and increases CD4 counts in antiretroviral naive and experienced individuals, although the most recent Cochrane review found some evidence that this approach might have favorable effects. Helminth infection also lowers the immune responses to vaccination for other diseases such as BCG, measles, and Hepatitis B.

==== Chronic illness ====
Chronic helminthiasis may cause severe morbidity. Helminthiasis has been found to result in poor birth outcome, poor cognitive development, poor school and work performance, decreased productivity, poor socioeconomic development, and poverty.

==== Malnutrition ====
Helminthiasis may cause chronic illness through malnutrition including vitamin deficiencies, stunted growth, anemia, and protein-energy malnutrition. Worms compete directly with their hosts for nutrients, but the magnitude of this effect is likely minimal as the nutritional requirements of worms is relatively small. In pigs and humans, Ascaris has been linked to lactose intolerance and vitamin A, amino acid, and fat malabsorption. Impaired nutrient uptake may result from direct damage to the intestinal mucosal wall or from more subtle changes such as chemical imbalances and changes in gut flora. Alternatively, the worms' release of protease inhibitors to defend against the body's digestive processes may impair the breakdown of other nutrients. In addition, worm induced diarrhoea may shorten gut transit time, thus reducing absorption of nutrients.

Malnutrition due to worms can give rise to anorexia. A study of 459 children in Zanzibar revealed spontaneous increases in appetite after deworming. Anorexia might be a result of the body's immune response and the stress of combating infection. Specifically, some of the cytokines released in the immune response to worm infestation have been linked to anorexia in animals.

==== Anemia ====
Helminths may cause iron-deficiency anemia. This is most severe in heavy hookworm infections, as Necator americanus and Ancylostoma duodenale feed directly on the blood of their hosts. Although the daily consumption of an individual worm (0.02–0.07 ml and 0.14–0.26 ml respectively) is small, the collective consumption under heavy infection can be clinically significant. Intestinal whipworm may also cause anemia. Anemia has also been associated with reduced stamina for physical labor, a decline in the ability to learn new information, and apathy, irritability, and fatigue. A study of the effect of deworming and iron supplementation in 47 students from the Democratic Republic of the Congo found that the intervention improved cognitive function. Another study found that in 159 Jamaican schoolchildren, deworming led to better auditory short-term memory and scanning and retrieval of long-term memory over a period of nine-weeks.

==== Cognitive changes ====
Malnutrition due to helminths may affect cognitive function leading to low educational performance, decreased concentration and difficulty with abstract cognitive tasks. Iron deficiency in infants and preschoolers is associated with "lower scores ... on tests of mental and motor development ... [as well as] increased fearfulness, inattentiveness, and decreased social responsiveness". Studies in the Philippines and Indonesia found a significant correlation between helminthiasis and decreased memory and fluency. Large parasite burdens, particularly severe hookworm infections, are also associated with absenteeism, under-enrollment, and attrition in school children.

== Transmission ==
Helminths are transmitted to the final host in several ways. The most common infection is through ingestion of contaminated vegetables, drinking water, and raw or undercooked meat. Contaminated food may contain eggs of nematodes such as Ascaris, Enterobius, and Trichuris; cestodes such as Taenia, Hymenolepis, and Echinococcus; and trematodes such as Fasciola. Raw or undercooked meats are the major sources of Taenia (pork, beef and venison), Trichinella (pork and bear), Diphyllobothrium (fish), Clonorchis (fish), and Paragonimus (crustaceans). Schistosomes and nematodes such as hookworms (Ancylostoma and Necator) and Strongyloides can penetrate the skin directly.

The roundworm, Dracunculus has a complex mode of transmission: it is acquired from drinking infested water or eating frogs and fish that contain (had eaten) infected crustaceans (copepods); and can also be transmitted from infected pets (cats and dogs). Roundworms such as Brugia, Wuchereria and Onchocerca are directly transmitted by mosquitoes. In the developing world, the use of contaminated water is a major risk factor for infection. Infection can also take place through the practice of geophagy, which is not uncommon in parts of sub-Saharan Africa. Soil is eaten, for example, by children or pregnant women to counteract a real or perceived deficiency of minerals in their diet.

== Diagnosis ==
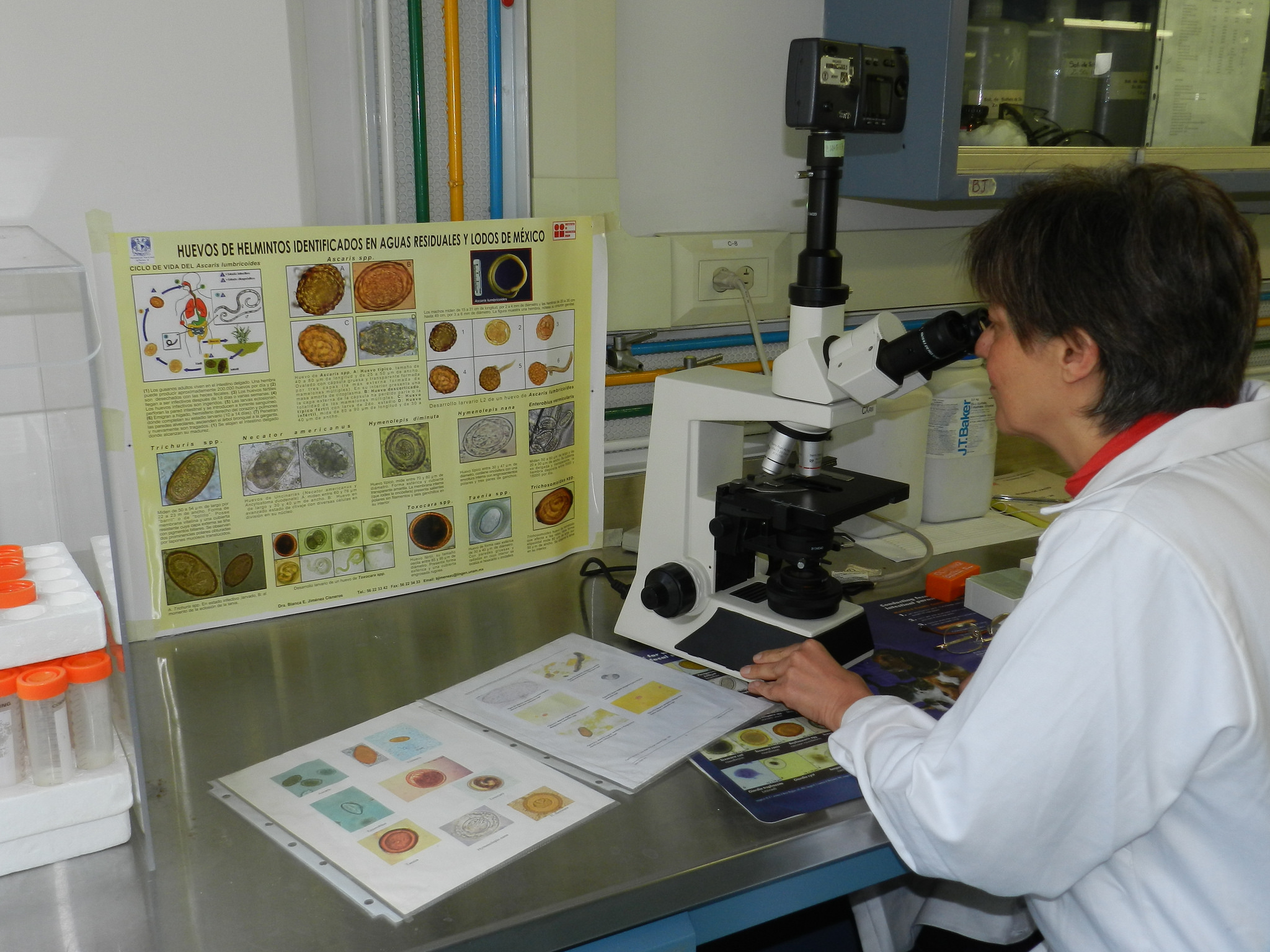
Identification and quantification of helminth eggs at UNAM university in Mexico City, Mexico

Specific helminths can be identified through microscopic examination of their eggs (ova) found in faecal samples. The number of eggs is measured in units of eggs per gram. However, it does not quantify mixed infections, and in practice, is inaccurate for quantifying the eggs of schistosomes and soil-transmitted helminths. Sophisticated tests such as serological assays, antigen tests, and molecular diagnosis are also available; however, they are time-consuming, expensive and not always reliable.

== Prevention ==
Disrupting the cycle of the worm will prevent infestation and re-infestation. Prevention of infection can largely be achieved by addressing the issues of WASH—water, sanitation and hygiene. The reduction of open defecation is particularly called for, as is stopping the use of human waste as fertilizer.

Further preventive measures include adherence to appropriate food hygiene, wearing of shoes, regular deworming of pets, and the proper disposal of their feces.

Scientists are also searching for a vaccine against helminths, such as a hookworm vaccine.

== Treatment ==
=== Medications ===
Broad-spectrum benzimidazoles (such as albendazole and mebendazole) are the first line treatment of intestinal roundworm and tapeworm infections. Macrocyclic lactones (such as ivermectin) are effective against adult and migrating larval stages of nematodes. Praziquantel is the drug of choice for schistosomiasis, taeniasis, and most types of food-borne trematodiases. Oxamniquine is also widely used in mass deworming programmes. Pyrantel is commonly used for veterinary nematodiasis. Artemisinins and derivatives are proving to be candidates as drugs of choice for trematodiasis.

=== Mass deworming ===
In regions where helminthiasis is common, mass deworming treatments may be performed, particularly among school-age children, who are a high-risk group. Most of these initiatives are undertaken by the World Health Organization (WHO) with positive outcomes in many regions. Deworming programs can improve school attendance by 25 percent. Although deworming improves the health of an individual, outcomes from mass deworming campaigns, such as reduced deaths or increases in cognitive ability, nutritional benefits, physical growth, and performance, are uncertain or not apparent.

=== Surgery ===
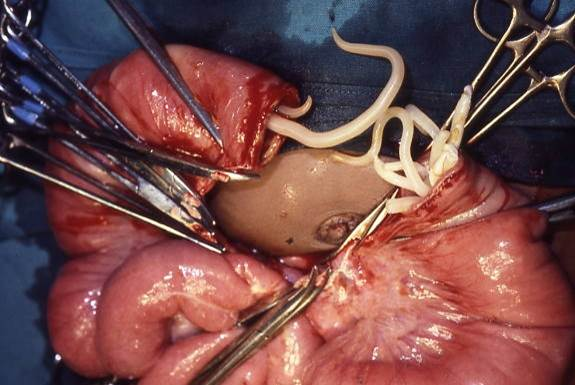
Example of ascariasis (ascaris infection) - Difficult surgical procedure in South Africa on a gangrenous piece of bowel that had to be cut out; live ascaris worms are emerging.

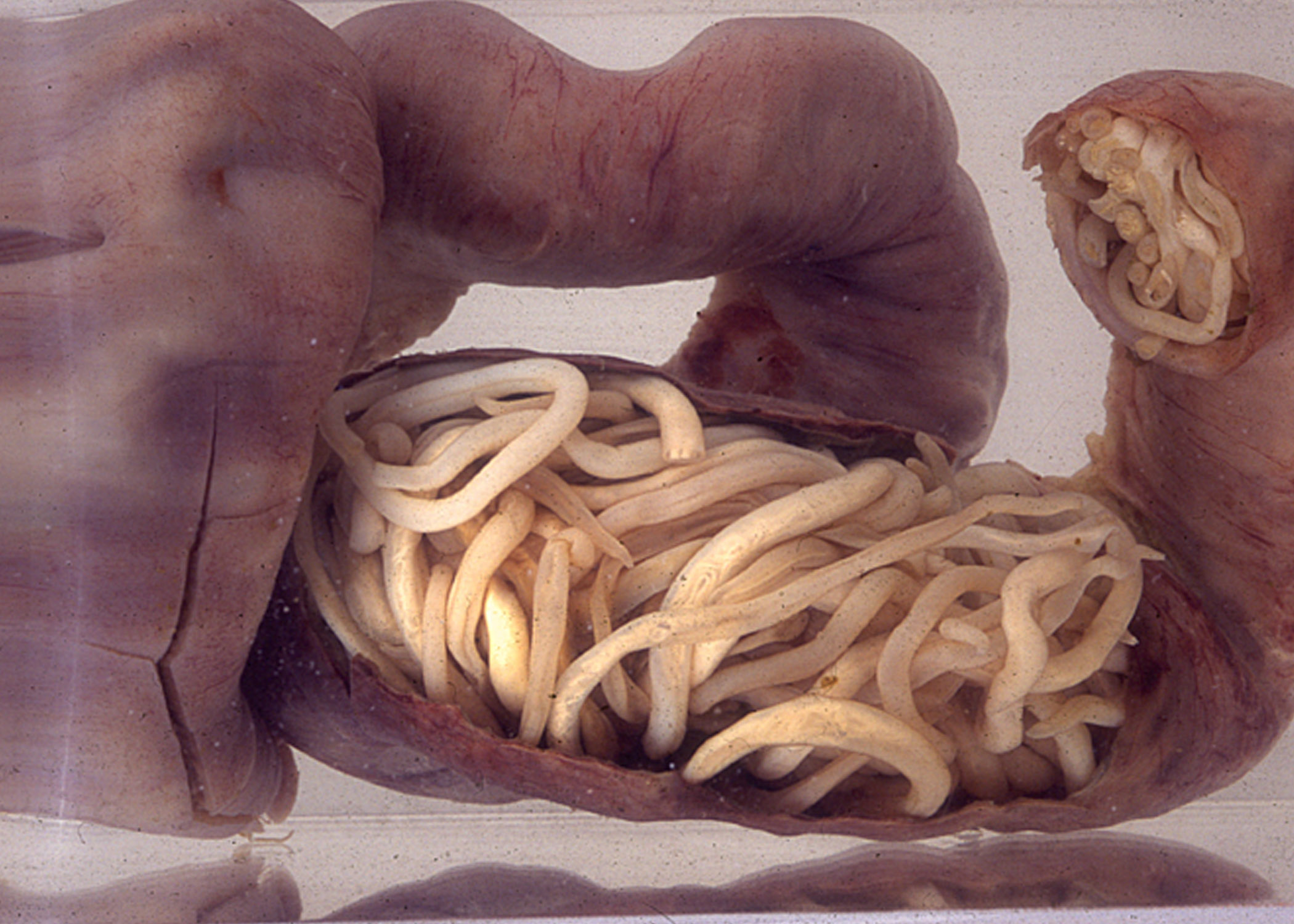
Piece of intestine, blocked by worms, surgically removed from a 3-year-old boy in South Africa.

If complications of helminthiasis, such as intestinal obstruction occur, emergency surgery may be required. Patients who require non-emergency surgery, for instance for removal of worms from the biliary tree, can be pre-treated with the anthelmintic drug albendazole.

== Epidemiology ==
Areas with the highest prevalence of helminthiasis are tropical and subtropical areas including sub-Saharan Africa, central and east Asia, and the Americas.

=== Neglected tropical diseases ===
Some types of helminthiases are classified as neglected tropical diseases. They include:

- Soil-transmitted helminthiases
- Roundworm infections such as lymphatic filariasis, dracunculiasis, and onchocerciasis
- Trematode infections, such as schistosomiasis, and food-borne trematodiases, including fascioliasis, clonorchiasis, opisthorchiasis, and paragonimiasis
- Tapeworm infections such as cysticercosis, taeniasis, and echinococcosis

=== Prevalence ===
The soil-transmitted helminths (A. lumbricoides, T. trichiura, N. americanus, A. duodenale), schistosomes, and filarial worms collectively infect more than a quarter of the human population worldwide at any one time, far surpassing HIV and malaria together. Schistosomiasis is the second most prevalent parasitic disease of humans after malaria.

In 2014–15, the WHO estimated that approximately 2 billion people were infected with soil-transmitted helminthiases, 249 million with schistosomiasis, 56 million people with food-borne trematodiasis, 120 million with lymphatic filariasis, 37 million people with onchocerciasis, and 1 million people with echinococcosis. Another source estimated a much higher figure of 3.5 billion infected with one or more soil-transmitted helminths.

In 2014, only 148 people were reported to have dracunculiasis because of a successful eradication campaign for that particular helminth, which is easier to eradicate than other helminths as it is transmitted only by drinking contaminated water.

Because of their high mobility and lower standards of hygiene, school-age children are particularly vulnerable to helminthiasis. Most children from developing nations will have at least one infestation. Multi-species infections are very common.

As with other infectious diseases, climate change will have an effect on the distribution and the risk of transmission of helminthiasis. However, it depends on the geographical region, disease-carrying species, the exact climate change scenario, and many other factors whether there will be a decrease or increase in helminthiasis.

In domestic animals, climate change will also have an impact on helminthiasis. For example, in Europe helminths have now spread further towards the poles, with higher survival rate and higher reproductive capacity (fecundity). Detailed long-term records of both livestock diseases and various agricultural interventions in Europe mean that demonstrating the role of climate change in the increased helminth burden in livestock is actually easier than attributing the impact of climate change on diseases which affect humans.

The most common intestinal parasites in the United States are Enterobius vermicularis, Giardia lamblia, Ancylostoma duodenale, Necator americanus, and Entamoeba histolytica.

In a developing country like Bangladesh, the most common species are round worm (Ascaris lumbricoides), whipworm (Tricurias tricuras) and hookworm (Ancylostoma duodenalis).

=== Variations within communities ===
Even in areas of high prevalence, the frequency and severity of infection is not uniform within communities or families. A small proportion of community members harbour the majority of worms, and this depends on age. The maximum worm burden is at five to ten years of age, declining rapidly thereafter. Individual predisposition to helminthiasis for people with the same sanitation infrastructure and hygiene behavior is thought to result from differing immunocompetence, nutritional status, and genetic factors. Because individuals are predisposed to a high or a low worm burden, the burden reacquired after successful treatment is proportional to that before treatment.

=== Disability-adjusted life years ===
It is estimated that intestinal nematode infections cause 5 million disability-adjusted life years (DALYS) to be lost, of which hookworm infections account for more than 3 million DALYS and ascaris infections more than 1 million. There are also signs of progress: The Global Burden of Disease Study published in 2015 estimates a 46 percent (59 percent when age standardised) reduction in years lived with disability (YLD) for the 13-year time period from 1990 to 2013 for all intestinal/nematode infections, and even a 74 percent (80 percent when age standardised) reduction in YLD from ascariasis.

=== Deaths ===
As many as 135,000 die annually from soil transmitted helminthiasis.

The 1990–2013 Global Burden of Disease Study estimated 5,500 direct deaths from schistosomiasis, while more than 200,000 people were estimated in 2013 to die annually from causes related to schistosomiasis. Another 20 million have severe consequences from the disease. It is the most deadly of the neglected tropical diseases.

Helminth genera	Common name	Infections (million per year)	Direct deaths per year	Regions where common
Soil transmitted helminthiasis (STH) (classified as neglected tropical disease):
Ascaris lumbricoides	Roundworm	1000 to 1450 807 to 1,121	20,000	Many regions of South-east Asia, Africa, and Central and South America
Trichuris trichiura	Whipworm	500 604–795		In moist, warm, tropical regions of Asia, Africa, Central and South America, and the Caribbean islands.
Ancylostoma duodenale	Hookworm	900 to 1300 576–740 (hookworm in general)		In tropical and subtropical countries (Sub-Saharan Africa)
Necator americanus	Hookworm	900 to 1300 576–740 (hookworm in general)		In tropical and subtropical countries (Sub-Saharan Africa)
Strongyloides stercoralis	Hookworm, pinworm	50 to 100	Thousands	In moist rainy areas of the tropics and subtropics, in some areas of southern and eastern Europe and of the United States of America
All STH together		1500 to 2000	135,000	Tropical and subtropical areas, in particular sub-Saharan Africa, the Americas, China and east Asia.
Not transmitted via soil but classified as neglected tropical disease:
Schistosoma mansoni	Blood fluke	All types of Schistosoma together: 160 to 200 (210 "affected")	12,000 150,000 deaths from kidney failure 200,000 indirect deaths from "causes related to" Schistosomiasis	In tropical and subtropical regions
Schistosoma haematobium		112 (in Sub-Saharan Africa alone)	12,000 150,000 deaths from kidney failure 200,000 indirect deaths from "causes related to" Schistosomiasis	
Echinococcus granulosus		3		Developing countries
Not transmitted via soil and not classified as neglected tropical disease:
Toxocara canis	Dog roundworm	50		Many regions of South-east Asia, Africa, and Central and South America
Taenia solium	Pork tapeworm	50		South America, Southeast Asia, West Africa and East Africa
Taenia saginata	Beef tapeworm	50 (all types of Taenia: 40 to 60)		South America, Southeast Asia, West Africa and East Africa
Hymenolepis nana	Dwarf tapeworm	100		South America, Southeast Asia, West Africa and East Africa
Hymenolepis diminuta	Rat tapeworm	100		South America, Southeast Asia, West Africa and East Africa
Fasciola hepatica, Fascioloides magna	Liver fluke	50		Largely in southern and eastern Asia but also in central and eastern Europe
Fasciolopsis buski	Giant intestinal fluke	50		Largely in southern and eastern Asia but also in central and eastern Europe
Dracunculus medinensis	Guinea worm	Negligible thanks to eradication program		Formerly widespread in India, west Africa and southern Sudan
Trichostrongylus orientalis	Roundworm	1–3 ("several")		Rural communities in Asia
Other		100		Worldwide
Total (number of infections)		Approx. 3.5 billion		Worldwide

== See also ==
- Kato technique
