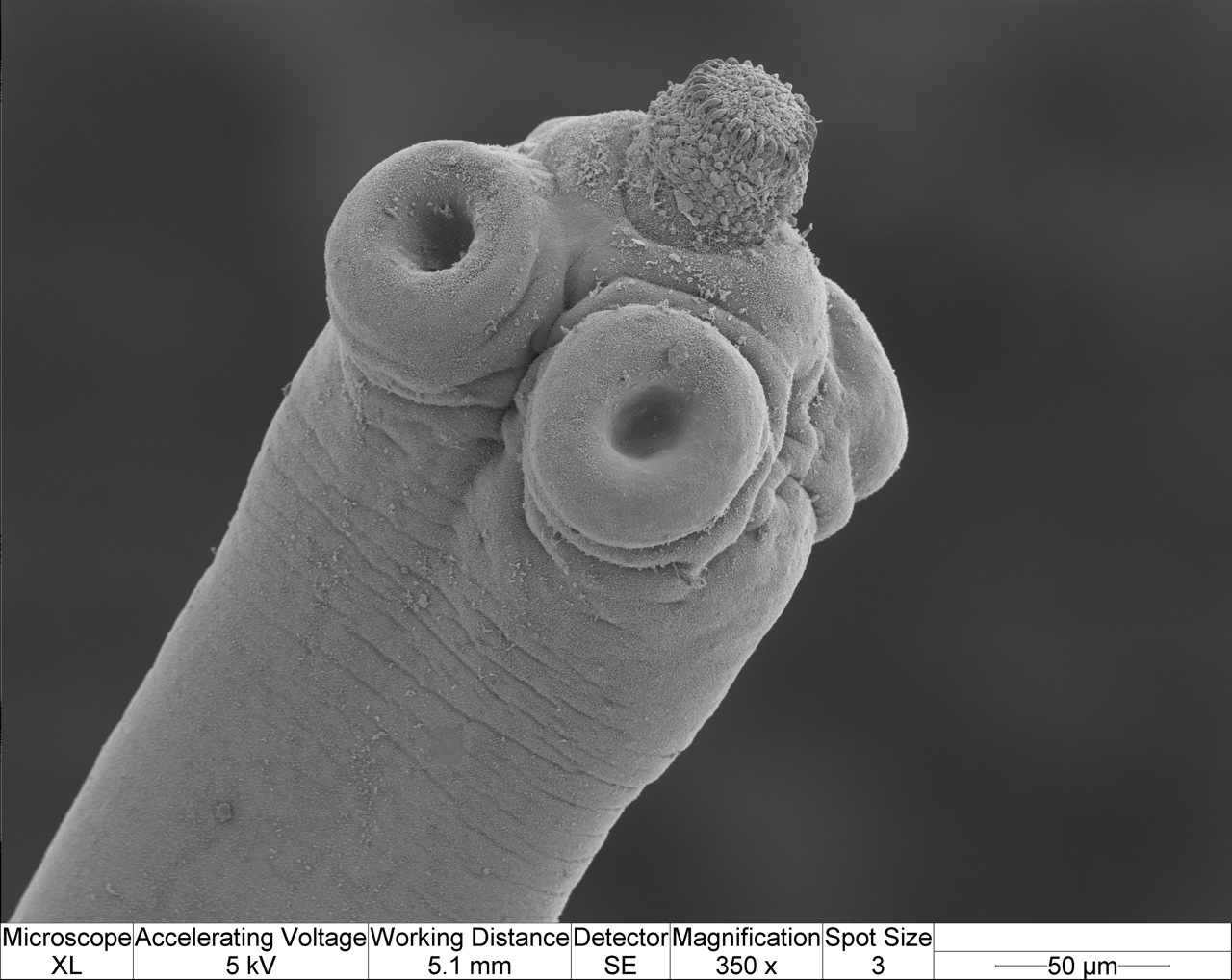

Scientific classification
- Kingdom: Animalia
- Phylum: Platyhelminthes
- Class: Cestoda
- Order: Cyclophyllidea
- Family: Hymenolepididae
- Genus: Hymenolepis
- Species: H. microstoma

Binomial name
- Hymenolepis microstoma Dujardin, 1845

Synonyms
- Vampirolepis microstoma (Dujardin, 1854) Spasskii, 1954; Rodentolepis microstoma (Dujardin, 1854) Spasskii, 1954; Taenia microstoma Dujardin, 1845; Taenia brachydera Diesing, 1854; Taenia murisdecumani Diesing, 1863

= Hymenolepis microstoma =

Species of flatworm

Hymenolepis microstoma, also known as the rodent tapeworm, is an intestinal dwelling parasite. Adult worms live in the bile duct and small intestines of mice and rats, and larvae metamorphose in the haemocoel of beetles. It belongs to the genus Hymenolepis; tapeworms that cause hymenolepiasis. H. microstoma is prevalent in rodents worldwide, but rarely infects humans.

== Ecology ==
Hymenolepis microstoma is an obligate parasite. Adults live in the bile duct and small intestine of rodents such as mice (Mus musculus), and larvae infect grain beetles such as Tribolium spp., in which they metamorphose from larvae into juvenile worms. Worms vary from 4 to 30 cm in length, depending on the age and number of worms within the host. Adults have completely lost their mouth and intestine. Instead they use their skin (tegument) to absorb nutrients directly from the host gut.

Hymenolepis species and other tapeworms often exhibit a 'crowding effect' in which the total biomass of the worms stays more or less constant, regardless of the intensity of infection. Thus low intensity infections result in larger worms and high intensity infections produce smaller worms. Under laboratory conditions, H. microstoma adult infections in mice are typically limited to approximately 12 worms.

== Life cycle ==
The cycle begins as arthropods become intermediate hosts by ingesting the parasite eggs. Oncospheral larvae are released from the eggs and use hooks and secreted enzymes to penetrate the gut of the beetles and enter the haemocoel. In the haemocoel the larvae undergo complete cellular reorganization (i.e. metamorphosis), transforming into cysticercoid larvae in approximately 7–10 days. The larvae can remain in the cysticercoid stage in the beetle as long as the lifespan of the adult beetle (up to 3 years), although any age-related decrease in viability has not been studied. When ingested, the eggs develop into cysticercoids. Rodents can become infected when they eat arthropods, such as flour beetles (Tribolium ssp). Humans, especially children, can ingest the arthropods as well and therefore become infected via the same mechanism. Rodents, especially rats, are definitive hosts and natural reservoirs of H. microstoma. As the definitive host (rats) eats an infected arthropod, cysticercoids present in the body cavity transform into the adult worm. Juvenile worms establish in the bile duct of mice after approximately 3 days movement within the upper gastrointestinal tract. Once established in the bile duct, the worms then mature sexually and begin producing eggs within approximately 1 week. Eggs are released with mouse faeces and thus dispersal is passive - through the movement and defecation of mice. Adult worm infections in mice held under laboratory conditions persist for 6–12 months.

Worms reproduce sexually via the cross fertilization of segments, each of which contains a complete complement of male and female reproductive organs (hermaphroditic). Shelled embryos develop in the ovaries through spiral cleavage, to become infective larvae with 3 pairs of hooks. When ingested by beetles, these larvae use their hooks and secretory glands to penetrate the gut of the beetle and enter the haemocoel where they undergo complete metamorphosis into cysticercoid larvae, replete with an adult scolex, ready for establishment in the final host.

== Cytology ==
Like all flatworms (phylum Platyhelminthes), H. microstoma maintains totipotent stem cells (called neoblasts in flatworms) throughout its life cycle. These are located in the neck region of the adult worms and are responsible for the continual production of new organs during the process of strobilation (segment formation). Neoblasts divide in the neck region and become incorporated into new segments where they eventually differentiate into the reproductive organs and other elements of the body. The diploid chromosome number of H. microstoma is 12 and the total genome size has been estimated by the Sanger Institute to be 1.4 megabases (with GC-content of ~35%). These values are similar to the genomes of the fox tapeworm Echinococcus multilocularis and the pig tapeworm Taenia solium. All three species belonging to the tapeworm order Cyclophyllidea. Genome sizes outside of this order are presently unknown.

== Evolution ==
The parasitic flatworms, which includes tapeworms, flukes and monogeneans, evolved from a single major lineage of free-living flatworm ancestors. The switch from a free-living to a parasitic lifestyle in the common ancestor of the parasitic flatworms involved a fundamental change in their tegument, which is found in all contemporary groups. Early-branching tapeworm groups are found in bony (e.g. teleost) and cartilaginous fishes (e.g. sharks and rays) and have entirely aquatic life cycles involving arthropod (e.g. copepods) first intermediate hosts and vertebrate (fish) final hosts. Tetrapod hosts (including mice and humans) were acquired later in tapeworm evolution and eventually part-aquatic life cycles led to the evolution of fully terrestrial life cycles, albeit still involving an arthropod intermediate host and a vertebrate definitive host. Hymenolepis microstoma is a member of the Cyclophyllidea, one of the youngest and most species-rich group of tapeworms.

== Research impact ==
Most of our understanding of the basic biology of tapeworms, such as their anatomy, physiology and ultrastructure, stems from work on this genus. Species in the genus Hymenolepis (e.g. H. diminuta, H. microstoma, H. nana) have been maintained as laboratory models for studying tapeworm biology since the 1950s. They can be readily maintained in vivo in rodent and beetle hosts, which makes them useful for teaching and research purposes. They can also be grown in culture (in vitro), giving easy manipulation of the life cycle..

== Infection and treatment ==
Hymenolepis microstoma primarily infects rodents, and is only very rarely found in humans. Human H. microstoma infection is often asymptomatic, but abdominal pain, irritability, itching, and eosinophilia are among the existing symptoms in a few of the reported cases. Since data regarding praziquantel treatment of H. microstoma is sparse, scientists have recommended that every case and treatment of H. microstoma be reported for development of protocols and parasitological purposes.
