= Hymenolepis =

Hymenolepis may refer to:

- Hymenolepis (plant)
- Hymenolepis (flatworm)

== See also ==
- Hymenolepiasis, a tapeworm infection
