= Rodentolepis =

Scientific classification
- Kingdom: Animalia
- Phylum: Platyhelminthes
- Class: Cestoda
- Order: Cyclophyllidea
- Family: Hymenolepididae
- Genus: Rodentolepis; Spasskii, 1954

Synonyms
- Diplacanthus Weinland, 1858; Diplocanthus Cohn, 1899

Genus of flatworms

Rodentolepis is a genus of tapeworms belonging to the family Hymenolepididae.

The genus has cosmopolitan distribution.

Species:

- Rodentolepis akodontis Rego, 1967
- Rodentolepis asymmetrica (Janicki, 1904)
- Rodentolepis avetjanea Akhumian, 1956
- Rodentolepis erinacei (Gmelin, 1790)
- Rodentolepis evaginata (Barker & Andrews, 1915)
- Rodentolepis fraterna (Stiles, 1906)
- Rodentolepis microstoma (Dujardin, 1845)
- Rodentolepis myoxi (Rudolphi, 1819)
- Rodentolepis nana (von Siebold, 1852)
- Rodentolepis octocoronata (von Linstow, 1879)
- Rodentolepis straminea (Goeze, 1782)
