= Hymenolepis tualatinensis =

Scientific classification
- Kingdom: Animalia
- Phylum: Platyhelminthes
- Class: Cestoda
- Order: Cyclophyllidea
- Family: Hymenolepididae
- Genus: Hymenolepis
- Species: H. tualatinensis

Binomial name
- Hymenolepis tualatinensis Gardner, 1985

Species of flatworm

Hymenolepis tualatinensis a species of parasitic cestodes (tapeworms), in the genus Hymenolepis. It was originally described in 1985 from the gastrointestinal tract of the Camas pocket gopher (Thomomys bulbivorus).
