= Confluaria islandica =

Scientific classification
- Domain: Eukaryota
- Kingdom: Animalia
- Phylum: Platyhelminthes
- Class: Cestoda
- Order: Cyclophyllidea
- Family: Hymenolepididae
- Genus: Confluaria
- Species: C. islandica

Binomial name
- Confluaria islandica Vasileva, Skirnisson & Georgiev, 2008

Species of flatworm

Confluaria islandica is an endoparasitic tapeworm which infects the small intestine of the horned grebe. It has only been found in Lake Mývatn, Iceland.

== Taxonomy ==
Palearctic grebes usually occur alongside each other, which limits their parasites from evolving to become host-specific. Indeed, several species of grebes in the Palearctic display high levels of "parasite exchange" and share many species of parasites. However, the horned grebe is the only species of grebe that lives in Iceland. Additionally, the population of grebes on the island is distinct morphologically and ecologically from that of the mainland and does not occur alongside mainland horned grebes. This distinctness has allowed the species to develop a unique parasitic fauna, including the endemic digenean fluke Petasiger islandicus.

Confluaria islandica is the second endemic species of parasite to be described from Icelandic horned grebes. It was described in 2008 based on specimens collected from the intestines of horned grebes living in Lake Mývatn in Iceland.

== Description ==
Fully-grown individuals measure 40–57 mm in length, with a slender strobila that has a maximum width of 0.2–0.3 mm. There are eight inner longitudinal muscular bundles, four on the side of the dorsum and four on the side of the venter. The scolex is small, ranging from 93 to 168 μm in length and a maximum width of 80 to 142 μm at the edges of the suckers, and has a short conical rostrum. The scolex narrows towards and joins the neck. The suckers are oval, unarmed, and measure 39–64 μm in diameter.

The rostellum is short and thick-walled, with glandular cells present, and the thick-walled rostellar pouch extends beyond the posterior margins of the suckers. The rhynchus is short and covered with large, unique microtriches. There are ten rostellar hooks are arranged in a single row. The proglottides are craspedote and wider than long, with unilateral genital pores located at the middle of the lateral margin of the proglottis. The genital atrium is deep and has muscular walls, forming a short, wide genital papilla when the cirrus is evaginated.

The strobila is protandrous. There are three oval testes arranged triangularly, one poral and two antiporal. The external seminal vesicle is elliptical and connects to the cirrus-sac, which is elongate and thick-walled, by a narrow isthmus. The internal seminal vesicle is oval-shaped. The evaginated cirrus is short and cylindrical, with dense spines on the base. The ovary consists of three compact lobes, located ventral to the testes. The vitellarium is oval and situated posterior to the ovary. The seminal receptacle is voluminous and dorsal to the ovary. The vagina has a thick-walled copulatory region and a short conductive section. The developing uterus is sacciform and thick-walled, containing large, oval developing eggs, and expands to fill the median and lateral fields as it matures.

It can be distinguished from other species in its genus by its muscular, thick-walled genital atrium that has the side closer to the body end partitioned into male canal and female canals, the unique microtriches on the rhynchus, and its extremely short, cylindrical cirrus that tapers distally.

== Distribution ==
The species is only known from Lake Mývatn, Iceland.
