= Coenurosis in humans =

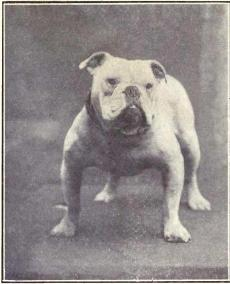
- The usual reservoir for coenurosis in humans is the dog
- Specialty: Infectious diseases

Coenurosis is a parasitic infection that results when humans ingest the eggs of dog tapeworm species Taenia multiceps, T. serialis, T. brauni, or T. glomerata.

It is important to distinguish that there is a very significant difference between intestinal human tapeworm infection and human coenurosis. Humans are the definitive hosts for some tapeworm species, the most common being T. saginata and T. solium (beef and pork tapeworms). This means that these species can develop into full grown, reproductively capable adult worms within the human body. People infected with these species have a tapeworm infection. In contrast, the four species that cause human coenurosis can only grow into mature, reproductively capable worms inside their definitive hosts, canids such as dogs, wolves, foxes and coyotes. Humans who ingest eggs from any of these four species of Taenia become intermediate hosts, or places where the eggs can mature into larvae but not into adult worms. When humans ingest these eggs, the eggs develop into tapeworm larvae that group within cysts known as coenuri, which can be seen in the central nervous system, muscles, and subcutaneous tissues of infected humans. People with coenurosis do not develop a tapeworm infection because the larvae of coenurosis-causing parasites cannot develop into worms inside of humans.

== Symptoms and signs ==
In humans, this parasitic infection causes a variety of symptoms, depending on where the cyst occurs. The tapeworm larvae group together to form fluid filled cysts in various body tissues. These cysts start out small, but as the larvae grow, the cyst can reach the size of an egg. The cysts of T. multiceps are usually between 2 and 6 cm in diameter and are most commonly found in the CNS and can contain anywhere from a few to over a hundred worm larvae within them. T. serialis and T. glomerata cysts present in the CNS, muscles, or subcutaneous tissue, and T. brauni cysts occupy these same areas but occur in the eye more frequently than the other three species.

When the cyst occurs in the brain, as it often does, the infected individual may experience neurological symptoms of headaches, seizures, vomiting, ataxia, paralysis affecting one side of the body (hemiplegia), paralysis involving one limb (monoplegia), and loss of ability to coordinate muscles and muscle movements. Many of these symptoms are due to the buildup of inter-cranial pressure from the growing cyst or from the cyst pressing on other parts of brain.

When the cyst occurs in the spinal cord, it can cause severe pain and inflammation, and loss of feeling in some nerves (arachnoiditis).

When the cyst occurs in the eyes, it causes decreased vision and headaches.

In the muscular and subcutaneous tissues, the cyst causes disfiguring nodules that can protrude out of the body. These nodules can be painful, uncomfortable, and can cause loss of muscle function.

== Transmission ==
The definitive hosts for these Taenia species are canids. The adult tapeworms live in the intestines of animals like dogs, foxes, and coyotes. Intermediate hosts such as rabbits, goats, sheep, horses, cattle and sometimes humans get the disease by inadvertently ingesting tapeworm eggs (gravid proglottids) that have been passed in the feces of an infected canid. This can happen from ingesting food, water or soil that has been contaminated by dog feces. The disease cannot be transmitted from one intermediate host to another, but it is still not a good idea to eat meat that presents with cystic nodules from coenurosis.

== Reservoir ==
Wild carnivores/ canids like dogs, coyotes, foxes and wolves.

== Incubation period ==
Cysts can present in humans anywhere from a few months to a few years after ingestion. Once the cyst develops, symptoms associated with the cyst develop rapidly.

== Morphology ==
The following are pictures of coenurosis cysts, some which have been surgically removed from humans and others that have been removed from animals after death.

== Life cycle ==
Eggs and gravid proglottids are shed in feces into the environment by infected definitive hosts (canids). Many animals may serve as intermediate hosts, including rodents, rabbits, cattle, sheep, goats and humans. These intermediate hosts ingest the eggs. Once ingested, the eggs hatch in the intestine, releasing oncospheres. These oncospheres circulate in the blood until they lodge in suitable organs (skeletal muscle, eyes, brain, muscles or subcutaneous tissue). After about three months or so, the oncospheres develop into cystic like larvae balls called coenuri. The cycle perpetuates when a canid (definitive host) ingests the tissue of an infected intermediate host. When this happens, the maturing larvae reside in the small intestine of the definitive host until they mature into adult worms and begin producing eggs (which will eventually be passed through feces into the environment once again).

== Diagnosis ==
Since coenurosis is very rare in humans, there are not many ways to diagnose it. The most common method for diagnosis involves using CT or MRI scans to visualize the cysts in the body. Some other clinical findings that can be used for diagnosis include papilledemas, hypoglycorrhacia, and high intracranial pressure caused by obstruction of the ventricles. Some serological and microscopic tests can confirm the presence of Taenia larvae once surgery has taken place and a portion of the cyst can be removed to undergo examination and biopsy. Because of the lack of specificity in diagnostic technique, coenurosis can be misdiagnosed as neurocysticercosis or echinococcosis, other parasitic diseases affecting nervous system tissue.

An important consideration in diagnosing coenurosis properly is learning about the infected person’s exposure history. If the person presenting symptoms lives in an area with poor sanitation, high wild dog population, or known endemic tapeworm, his chance of having coenurosis is much higher. Also, this disease is seen more often in children than adults because children spend time outside in the mud and generally are more likely than adults to come into contact with canid feces.

== Prevention ==
This disease has no vaccination. Preventative measures can be taken at community and individual levels. Communities and governments can make sure their water supply remains sanitary and free of dog feces and avoid fertilizing fields with dog manure. Communities can control wild dog populations, thus preventing infection of the definitive host. Individuals should wash all fruits and vegetables thoroughly before eating and make sure their dogs are not infected with tapeworm.

== Management ==
The most common and widely recognized treatment for this disease is surgical removal of the cysts. The disease is more complicated and severe when the oncosphere cysts form in the central nervous system tissue since this makes operating more difficult than when the disease presents in the muscles or subcutaneous tissues.

Alternative methods for treating coenurosis include administering anthelmintics and glucocorticoids. Praziquantel, Niclosamide, and Albendazole are the anthelminthics that are commonly used to treat coenurosis. Praziquantel works by causing contraction of the parasite by altering the permeability of the cell membrane. This causes paralysis of the parasite from loss of its intracellular calcium. The drug also causes vacuolization and disintegration of the parasite. Niclosamide works by uncoupling oxidative phosphorylation and inhibiting glucose uptake in the parasite. Albendazole works by binding to β- tubulin sites and inhibiting their polymerization into microtubules. This decreases the absorption ability of the parasite, leading to decreased glucose uptake and glycogen stores. The lack of glucose prevents the parasite from making enough ATP leading to the parasite’s death. Dexamethasone is the glucocorticoid that is normally administered for coenurosis. It inhibits pro-inflammatory signals and promotes anti-inflammatory signals in the body. Dexamethasone also causes decreased vasodilation in capillaries and inhibits apoptosis in neutrophils. Glucocorticoids can be used to help subdue the inflammatory symptoms of the disease.

== Prevalence ==
This disease is very rare in humans and only about 100 cases have ever been recorded. It is a more common problem in sheep and cattle and can be problematic for farmers in endemic regions of the world. Most human cases occur in developing countries such as India and Sub Saharan Africa where the dog population is not controlled or treated for tapeworm, and in areas lacking proper sanitation. T. multiceps has been reported in regions all over the world (both human and animal infections) and is the most common coenurosis causing species. T. serialis has been seen in North America, Europe and Africa, and T. brauni and T. glomerata have only been seen in Africa. This disease still occurs, even in developed countries. Some of the most recent reported cases occurred in France, Italy, Israel, Canada and the United States. Some experts suspect under reporting of this disease, especially in impoverished and developing countries where reporting technologies are more difficult to obtain. The global prevalence might be much higher than present data suggest.

== History ==
Because this disease so rarely occurs in humans, it took a long time for it to become recognized within the population, and species differentiation among the four different types is still somewhat difficult. Many cases of coenurosis probably existed years before it was recognized or discovered, but the first cases to be diagnosed for each of the four Taenia spp. were as follows:

- T. multiceps: In 1913, a man in Paris presented symptoms of CNS nerve degeneration. He had convulsions and trouble speaking/ understanding speech. During his autopsy, two coenuri were found in his brain.
- T. glomerate: In 1919, the first diagnosis was made in Nigeria. It is thought to be responsible for coenurosis in parts of Africa, but this is still unclear.
- T. serialis: In 1933, a French woman was proven to have coenurosis when the cyst that had been growing under her skin was extracted from her subcutaneous tissue and fed to a dog, which later developed tapeworm infection due to T. serialis.
- T. brauni: In 1956, the first coenurosis case due to T. brauni was diagnosed in Africa. It is only endemic in Africa.

=== Cases ===
Human cases have been recorded in Uganda, Kenya, Ghana, South Africa, Rwanda, Nigeria, Italy, Israel, Mexico, Canada and the United States, and animal cases have been found in many other countries as well.

In 1983, a 4-year-old girl in the USA was admitted to the hospital with progressive, generalized muscle weakness, inability to walk, rash, abdominal pain and deteriorating neurological ability. When the doctors did a CT scan, they saw fluid filled lumps in her brain and decided to operate. While operating, coenuri were found and the patient was immediately given chemotherapy with praziquantel. The coenurosis had already done too much damage to the CNS and the girl did not survive.

The most recent North American case took place in 1994 in Los Angeles, CA, when a 39-year-old man presented an enlarging mass on his back. When doctors tried to operate a large intramuscular capsule was found. The surgery was terminated, and a fine needle aspiration test revealed muscular coenurosis. The man was treated with praziquantel. The drug successfully killed the larvae and his infection never returned.

The most recent case on record to date took place in Israel in 2006. A 4-year-old girl had T. multiceps in her subcutaneous tissue. She received proper treatment and made a full recovery. In all of these recent cases, the infected individuals had been exposed to wild dogs in regions where canid tapeworm is considered endemic, and probably ingested the parasite accidentally through contact with contaminated food or water.

== See also ==
- Coenurosis in other animals
- Canine vector-borne disease
