= Confluaria furcifera =

Scientific classification
- Domain: Eukaryota
- Kingdom: Animalia
- Phylum: Platyhelminthes
- Class: Cestoda
- Order: Cyclophyllidea
- Family: Hymenolepididae
- Genus: Confluaria
- Species: C. furcifera

Binomial name
- Confluaria furcifera (Krabbe, 1869)

Synonyms
- Dubininolepis furcifera (Krabbe, 1869); Taenia furcifera Krabbe, 1869

Species of flatworm

Confluaria furcifera is an endoparasitic tapeworm which infects grebes in the Holarctic. It is common in the horned grebe in Lake Mývatn, Iceland and it has been reported from the great crested grebe (Podiceps cristatus australis) in Lake Wānaka, New Zealand.
