= Confluaria japonica =

Scientific classification
- Kingdom: Animalia
- Phylum: Platyhelminthes
- Class: Cestoda
- Order: Cyclophyllidea
- Family: Hymenolepididae
- Genus: Confluaria
- Species: C. japonica

Binomial name
- Confluaria japonica (Yamaguti, 1935)

Synonyms
- Hymenolepis japonica Yamaguti, 1935

Species of flatworm

Confluaria japonica is an endoparasitic tapeworm in the family Hymenolepididae. It infects the small intestine of the little grebe and numerous other bird species.
