= Vampirolepis =

Scientific classification
- Kingdom: Animalia
- Phylum: Platyhelminthes
- Class: Cestoda
- Order: Cyclophyllidea
- Family: Hymenolepididae
- Genus: Vampirolepis; Spasskii, 1954

Genus of flatworms

Vampirolepis is a genus of flatworms belonging to the family Hymenolepididae.

The genus has cosmopolitan distribution.

== Species ==
Species:

- Vampirolepis acollaris Sawada & Harada, 1985
- Vampirolepis acuta (Rudolphi, 1819)
- Vampirolepis baeri Murai, 1976
- Vampirolepis balsaci (Joyeux & Baer, 1934)
- Vampirolepis bihamata Sawada & Harada, 1986
- Vampirolepis brachysoma Sawada & Harada, 1988
- Vampirolepis chiangmaiensis Sawada & Harada, 1985
- Vampirolepis christensoni (Macy, 1931)
- Vampirolepis coelopis Sawada, Harada & Lin, 1996
- Vampirolepis crassihamata Sawada & Harada, 1986
- Vampirolepis curvihamata Sawada & Harada, 1985
- Vampirolepis formosana Sawada & Harada, 1989
- Vampirolepis glischropi Sawada & Yasuma, 1994
- Vampirolepis gracilistrobila Sawada & Harada, 1989
- Vampirolepis hipposideri (Prudhoe & Manger, 1969)
- Vampirolepis iraqensis Sawada & Molan, 1988
- Vampirolepis isensis Sawada, 1966
- Vampirolepis kaguyae Sawada, 1987
- Vampirolepis kawasakiensis Sawada, 1986
- Vampirolepis kengtingensis Sawada, Harada & Lin, 1996
- Vampirolepis khalili (Hilmy, 1936)
- Vampirolepis longicollaris Sawada & Harada, 1985
- Vampirolepis longisaccata Sawada & Harada, 1986
- Vampirolepis macrostrobiloides Sawada, 1984
- Vampirolepis magnihamata Sawada & Harada, 1989
- Vampirolepis mesopotamiana Sawada & Mohammad, 1989
- Vampirolepis molani Sawada & Molan, 1988
- Vampirolepis neomidis (Baer, 1931)
- Vampirolepis novadomensis Rysavy, 1971
- Vampirolepis novosibirskensis Sawada & Kobayashi, 1994
- Vampirolepis pandoensis Sawada & Harada, 1986
- Vampirolepis pipistrelli (Lopez-Neyra, 1941)
- Vampirolepis rikuchuensis Sawada, 1987
- Vampirolepis rysavyi Tenora & Barus, 1960
- Vampirolepis santacruzensis Sawada & Harada, 1986
- Vampirolepis scotophili (Sawada & Harada, 1988)
- Vampirolepis sessilihamata Sawada & Harada, 1989
- Vampirolepis shirotanii Sawada, 1985
- Vampirolepis siamensis Sawada & Harada, 1985
- Vampirolepis skrjabinariana (Skarbilovitsch, 1946)
- Vampirolepis soltysi Prokopic, 1957
- Vampirolepis spasskii Andreiko, Skvortsov & Konovalov, 1969
- Vampirolepis sunci Sawada & Harada, 1989
- Vampirolepis taiwanensis Sawada, 1984
- Vampirolepis tanegashimensis Sawada, 1984
- Vampirolepis urawaensis Sawada, 1989
- Vampirolepis versihamata Sawada & Harada, 1985
- Vampirolepis wakasensis Sawada, 1984
- Vampirolepis yakushimaensis Sawada, 1987
