= Diorchis =

Scientific classification
- Kingdom: Animalia
- Phylum: Platyhelminthes
- Class: Cestoda
- Order: Cyclophyllidea
- Family: Hymenolepididae
- Genus: Diorchis; Clerc, 1903

Genus of flatworms

Diorchis is a genus of flatworms belonging to the family Hymenolepididae.

The genus has cosmopolitan distribution.

Species:

- Diorchis acuminatus (Clerc, 1902)
- Diorchis americanus Ransom, 1909
- Diorchis brevis Rybicka, 1957
- Diorchis bulbodes Mayhew, 1929
- Diorchis danutae Czaplinski, 1956
- Diorchis diorchis (Fuhrmann, 1913)
- Diorchis donis Ajinov, 1960
- Diorchis endacantha (Dubinina, 1953)
- Diorchis flavescens Krefft, 1871
- Diorchis formosensis Sugimoto, 1934
- Diorchis inflata (Rudolphi, 1819)
- Diorchis longicirrosa Meggitt, 1927
- Diorchis longiovum Schiller, 1953
- Diorchis markewitschi Pastschenko, 1952
- Diorchis nitidohamulus Hovorka & Macko, 1972
- Diorchis ovofurcata Czaplinski, 1972
- Diorchis paranansomi Tanzola, 1992
- Diorchis parvogenitalis Mathevossian, 1945
- Diorchis ransomi Schultz, 1940
- Diorchis sobolevi Spasskaya, 1950
- Diorchis spasskajae Spasskii, 1963
- Diorchis spinata Mayhew, 1929
- Diorchis stefanskii Czaplinski, 1956
- Diorchis tuvensis Spasskii, 1963
- Diorchis wigginsi Schultz, 1940
