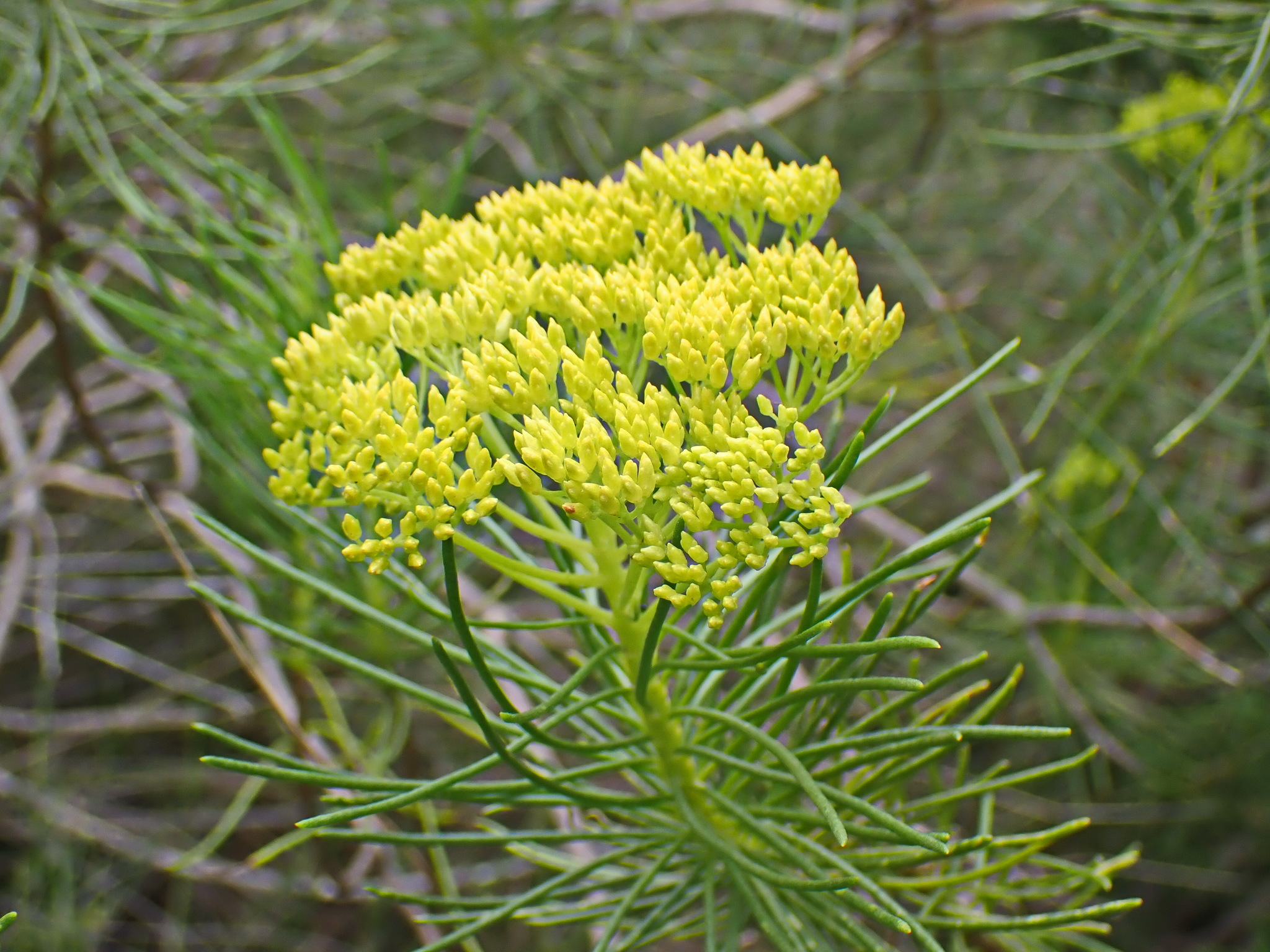

Scientific classification
- Kingdom: Plantae
- Clade: Tracheophytes
- Clade: Angiosperms
- Clade: Eudicots
- Clade: Asterids
- Order: Asterales
- Family: Asteraceae
- Genus: Hymenolepis
- Species: H. indivisa

Binomial name
- Hymenolepis indivisa (Harv.) Källersjö

Synonyms
- Athanasia indivisa Harv.

= Hymenolepis indivisa =

South African plant species

Hymenolepis indivisa is a species of flowering plant in the family Asteraceae. It is endemic to South Africa.

== Description ==
This slender and single branched shrub grows up to 1.5 m (4.9 ft) tall. The stem splits into a few sparse branches from about halfway up the plant. The small thread-like leaves roll outward and downward.

The yellow or golden-brown flowers are present between September and November. They are found clustered in round inflorescences. The stems bearing the flowers are clearly visible and the bracts are hairless.

== Distribution and habitat ==
This plant is endemic to the Eastern Cape of South Africa. It has been found on rocky mountains at an elevation of over 1,200 m (3,900 ft) between Makhanda and Great Winterhoek. It grows on sandstone slopes, mountain tops, grassland next to dams and in disturbed areas.
