= Fimbriaria (flatworm) =

Scientific classification
- Kingdom: Animalia
- Phylum: Platyhelminthes
- Class: Cestoda
- Order: Cyclophyllidea
- Family: Hymenolepididae
- Genus: Fimbriaria; Froelich, 1802

Synonyms
- Epision Linton, 1892; Notoborthrium von Linstow, 1905; Rhynchotaenia Diesing, 1850

Genus of flatworms

Fimbriaria is a genus of flatworms belonging to the family Hymenolepididae.

The genus has cosmopolitan distribution.

Species:

- Fimbriaria czaplinskii Grytner-Ziecina, 1994
- Fimbriaria fasciolaris (Pallas, 1781)
- Fimbriaria intermedia Fuhrmann, 1913
- Fimbriaria mergi Grytner-Ziecina & Cielecka, 1995
- Fimbriaria sarcinalis Grytner-Ziecina & Cielecka, 1994
- Fimbriaria teresae Grytner-Ziecina & Cielecka, 1995
