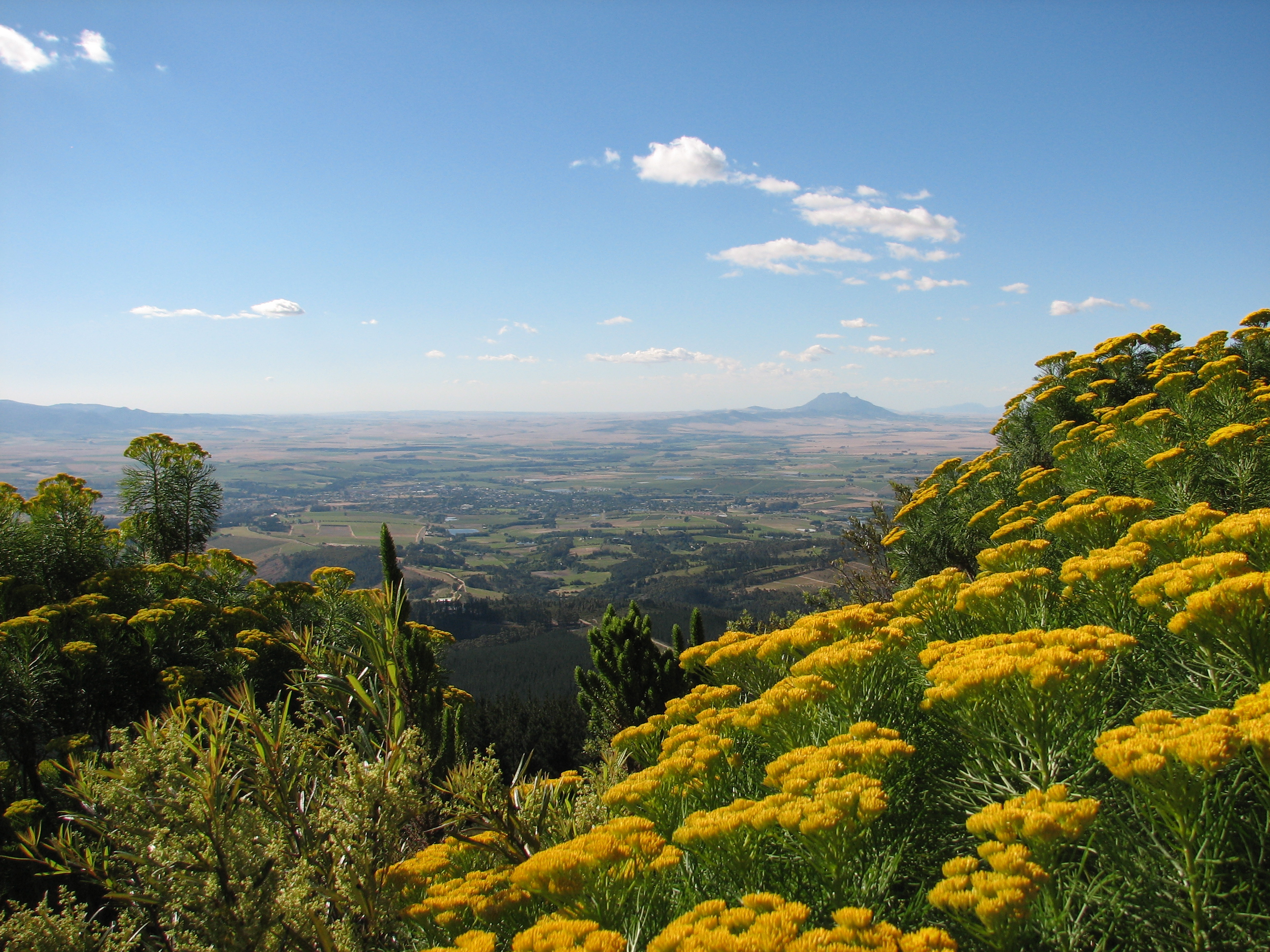

Scientific classification
- Kingdom: Plantae
- Clade: Tracheophytes
- Clade: Angiosperms
- Clade: Eudicots
- Clade: Asterids
- Order: Asterales
- Family: Asteraceae
- Genus: Hymenolepis
- Species: H. crithmifolia

Binomial name
- Hymenolepis crithmifolia Greuter, M.V.Agab. & Wagenitz, 2005

= Hymenolepis crithmifolia =

Species of plant

Hymenolepis crithmifolia, also known as pok coulterbush, is a species of flowering plant native to South Africa.

This plant is being investigated for cultivation in California.
