= Cysticercoid =

Larval tapeworm

A cysticercoid is the larval stage of certain tapeworms, similar in appearance to a cysticercus, but having the scolex filling completely the enclosing cyst. In tapeworm infections, cysticercoids can be seen in free form as well as enclosed by cysts in biological tissues such as the intestinal mucosa. Also referred to as metacestodes, they produce proteins enabling them to invade and to survive in the host. It is typically associated with cyclophyllid tapeworms that have an invertebrate intermediate host, but can appear in humans during the autoinfective cycle of Hymenolepis nana.

== See also ==
- Hymenolepiasis
