= Confluaria =

Scientific classification
- Kingdom: Animalia
- Phylum: Platyhelminthes
- Class: Cestoda
- Order: Cyclophyllidea
- Family: Hymenolepididae
- Genus: Confluaria; Ablasov, 1953

Synonyms
- Dimorphocanthus Maksimova, 1989

Genus of flatworms

Confluaria is a genus of flatworms belonging to the family Hymenolepididae. It contains six species, with the seventh species added in 2008.

- Confluaria capillaris (Rudolphi, 1810)
- Confluaria furcifera (Krabbe, 1869)
- Confluaria islandica Vasileva, Skirnisson & Georgiev, 2008
- Confluaria japonica (Yamaguti, 1935)
- Confluaria krabbei Vasileva, Kornyushin & Genov, 2001
- Confluaria podicipina (Szymanski, 1905)
- Confluaria pseudofurcifera Valiseva, Georgiev & Genov, 2000
