= Drepanidotaenia =

Scientific classification
- Kingdom: Animalia
- Phylum: Platyhelminthes
- Class: Cestoda
- Order: Cyclophyllidea
- Family: Hymenolepididae
- Genus: Drepanidotaenia; Railliet, 1892

Synonyms
- Drapanidotaenia Nuttall, 1899; Drepanidotuenia Cohn, 1901; Drepanitaenia Cohn, 1901; Drepanitotaenia Cohn, 1901; Drepidotaenia Stiles & Hassall, 1912; Trepanidotaenia Brumpt, 1910

Genus of tapeworms

Drepanidotaenia is a genus of tapeworms belonging to the family Hymenolepididae.

The genus has almost cosmopolitan distribution.

Species:

- Drepanidotaenia bisacculina Szpotanska, 1931
- Drepanidotaenia czaplinskii Kornyushin & Tkach, 1995
- Drepanidotaenia lanceolata (Bloch, 1782)
