= Echinolepis =

Scientific classification
- Kingdom: Animalia
- Phylum: Platyhelminthes
- Class: Cestoda
- Order: Cyclophyllidea
- Family: Hymenolepididae
- Genus: Echinolepis; Spasskii & Spasskaya, 1954
- Species: E. carioca

Binomial name
- Echinolepis carioca (Magelhaes, 1898)

Synonyms
- Davainea carioca Magelhaes, 1898

Genus of flatworms

Echinolepis is a monotypic genus of flatworms belonging to the family Hymenolepididae. The only species is Echinolepis carioca.

The species is found in Europe, Northern America.
