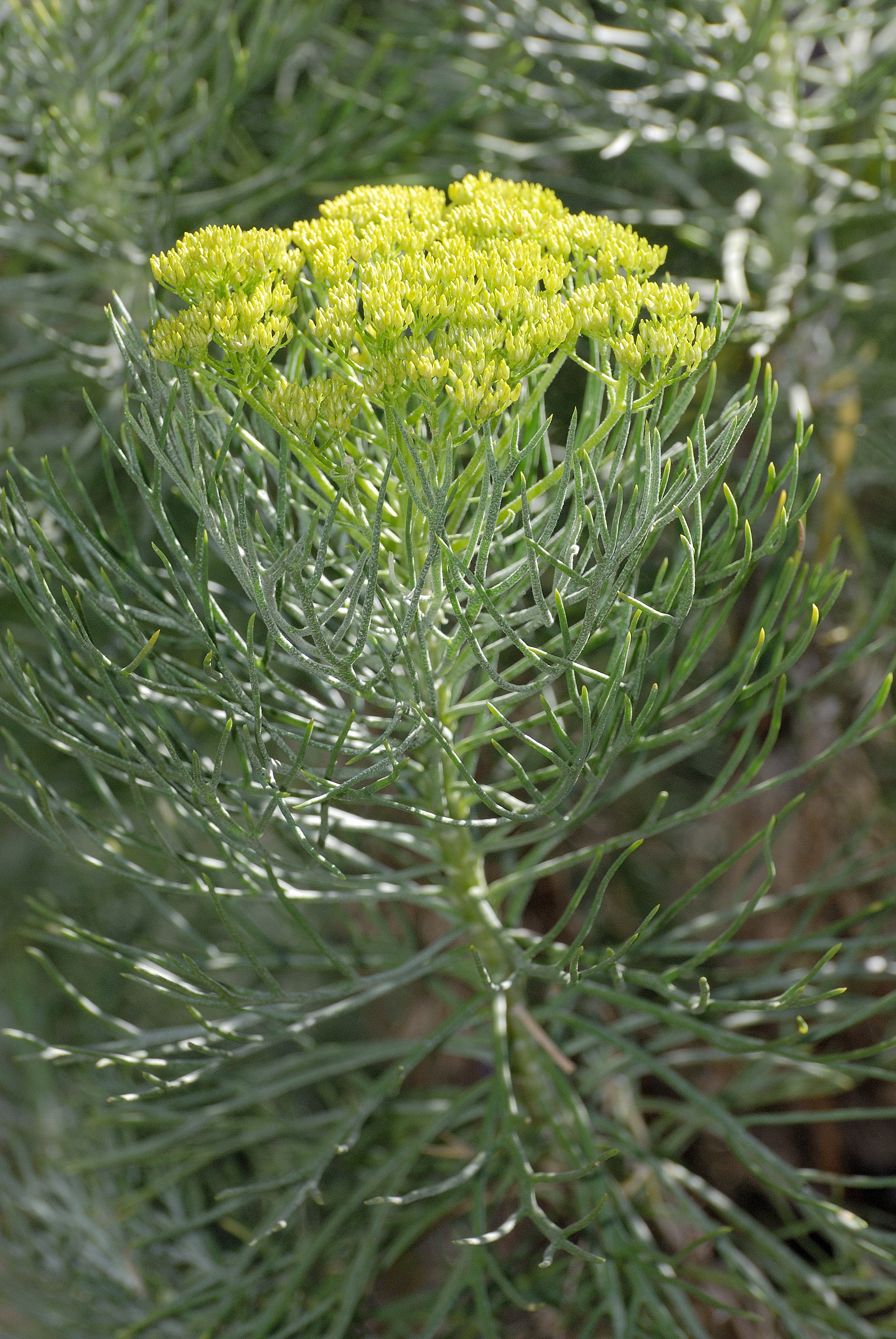
- Hymenolepis parviflora

Scientific classification
- Kingdom: Plantae
- Clade: Embryophytes
- Clade: Tracheophytes
- Clade: Angiosperms
- Clade: Eudicots
- Clade: Asterids
- Order: Asterales
- Family: Asteraceae
- Subfamily: Asteroideae
- Tribe: Anthemideae
- Genus: Hymenolepis; Cassini (1817) not Kaulf. 1824 (syn of Belvisia in Polypodiaceae)

Synonyms
- Cirsium sect. Hymenolepis C.Shih; Phaeocephalus S.Moore; Oligodora DC.

= Hymenolepis (plant) =

Genus of flowering plants

Hymenolepis is a South African genus of flowering plants in the daisy family.

Hymenolepis is differentiated from Athanasia by the pappus scales and slender capitulum. Some Euryops species are similar, but are distinguishable by their smaller flower heads that appear earlier, and their undivided leaves.

Species

- Hymenolepis crithmifolia
- Hymenolepis cynopus K.Bremer & Källersjö
- Hymenolepis dentata (DC.) Källersjö
- Hymenolepis gnidioides (S.Moore) Källersjö
- Hymenolepis incisa DC.
- Hymenolepis indivisa (Harv.) Källersjö
- Hymenolepis parviflora (L.) DC.
- Hymenolepis speciosa (Hutch.) Källersjö

Species in homotypic genus

In 1824, Kaulfuss used the same name, Hymenolepis, to refer to some ferns in the Polypodiaceae. Names created using this illegitimate generic name:

- Hymenolepis callifolia C.Chr. - Belvisia mucronata Copel.
- Hymenolepis glauca (Copel.) C.Chr. - Belvisia glauca (Copel.) Copel.
- Hymenolepis minor Copel. - Belvisia mucronata Copel.
- Hymenolepis novoguineensis (Rosenst.) C.Chr. - Belvisia novoguineensis (Rosenst.) Copel.
- Hymenolepis ophioglossoides Kaulf. - Belvisia spicata (L.f.) Mirb.
- Hymenolepis platyrhynchos Kunze - Belvisia platyrhynchos (Kunze) Copel.
- Hymenolepis rigidissima C.Chr.- ?
- Hymenolepis spicata (L.f.) C.Presl - Belvisia spicata (L.f.) Mirb.
- Hymenolepis validinervis Kunze - Belvisia validinervis (Kunze) Copel.
- Hymenolepis vaupelii Hieron. ex C. Chr. - Belvisia mucronata Copel.
