= Kato technique =

Laboratory method for human stool samples

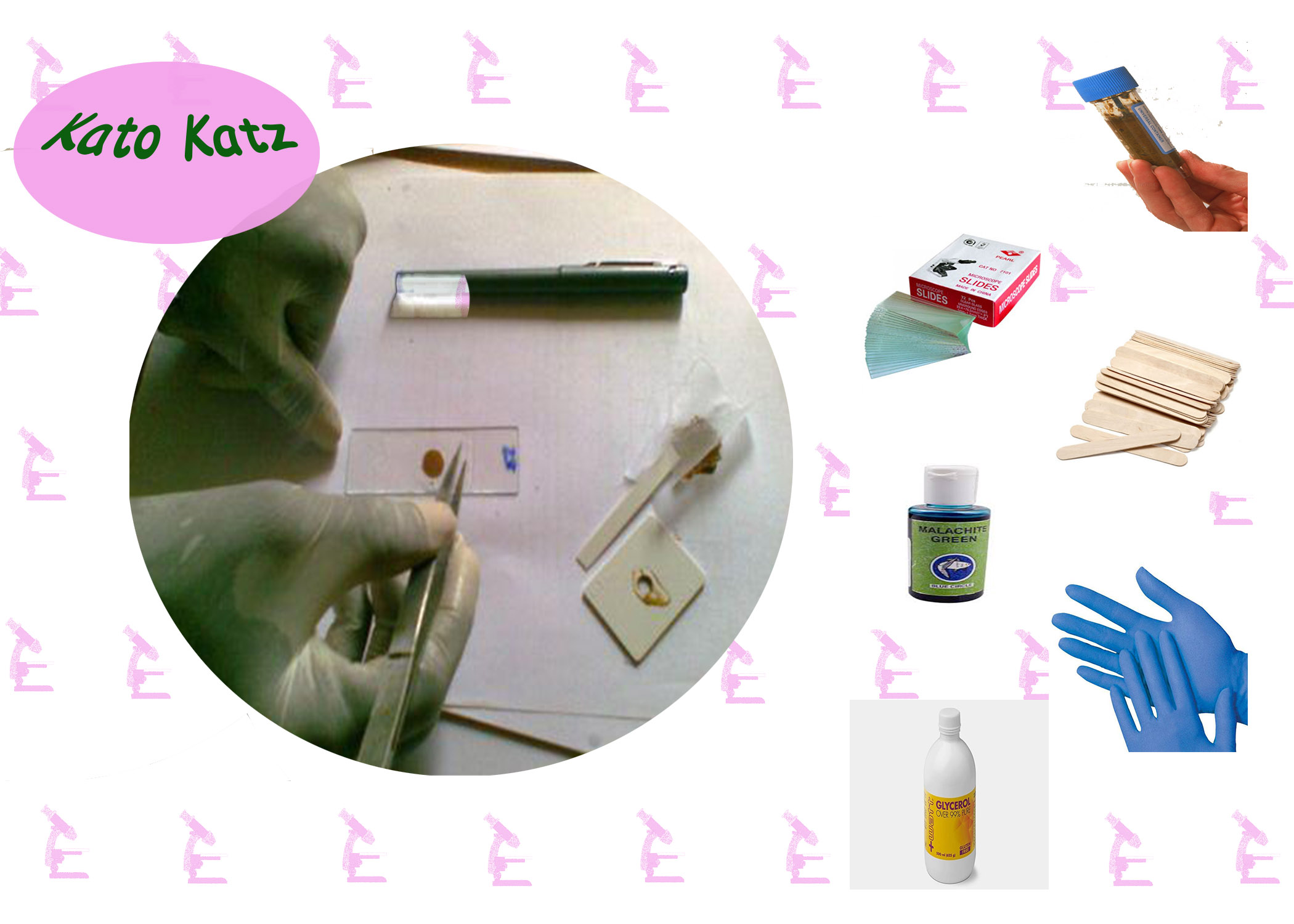
Supplies needed for the Kato-Katz technique

The Kato technique (also called the Kato–Katz technique) is a laboratory method for preparing human stool samples prior to searching for parasite eggs.

== Indications ==
The Kato technique is now most commonly used for detecting schistosome eggs. It has in the past been used for other helminth eggs as well. It cannot be used to identify hookworm eggs because they collapse within 30 to 60 minutes of preparation using this method. One study of 299 subjects infected with Schistosoma mansoni found that the method had poor reproducibility and is therefore no longer recommended for primary health care settings: the problem may be that eggs of S. mansoni tend to clump together which means that even slides prepared from the same specimen may contain widely different egg counts. A comparison with the point-of-care circulating cathodic antigen (POC-CCA) method showed that the Kato technique was less sensitive. The other main argument against the Kato technique is that it is messy and therefore exposes technicians to an unnecessarily high risk of infection.

== Method ==
The published methods vary in detail, but generally involves a standardized amount of sieved feces being examined under light microscopy, and subsequently get a standardized count of the amount of eggs therein, in terms of number of eggs per gram. It can possibly involve staining the fecal sample.

== History ==
It was developed in 1954 by Japanese medical laboratory scientist Dr. Katsuya Kato (1912–1991). The technique was modified for use in field studies in 1972 by a Brazilian team of researchers led by Brazilian parasitologist Naftale Katz (b.1940), and this modification was adopted by the WHO as a gold standard for multiple helminth infections.

== See also ==
- Eggs per gram
