= Eggs per gram =

Determination of parasite egg count in feces

Eggs per gram (eggs/g) is a laboratory test that determines the number of eggs per gram of feces in patients suspected of having a parasitological infection, such as schistosomiasis.

Measuring the number of eggs per gram is the primary diagnostic method for schistosomiasis, as opposed to a blood test. Eggs per gram or another analyse like larvae per gram of faeces is one of the most important experiments that is done in parasitology labs.

Methods to count the number of eggs per gram:

- Willis method
- McMaster method
- Clayton-Lane method

== See also ==
- Kato technique
- Helminths
