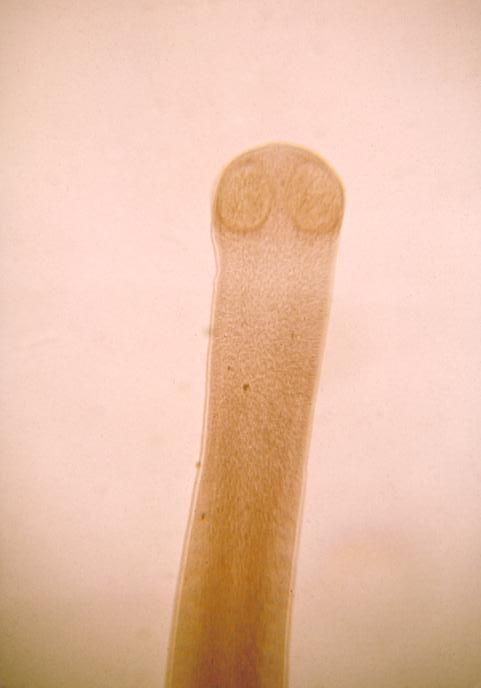

Scientific classification
- Kingdom: Animalia
- Phylum: Platyhelminthes
- Class: Cestoda
- Order: Cyclophyllidea
- Family: Hymenolepididae
- Genus: Hymenolepis
- Species: H. diminuta

Binomial name
- Hymenolepis diminuta (Rudolphi, 1819)

= Hymenolepis diminuta =

Species of flatworm

Hymenolepis diminuta, also known as rat tapeworm, is a species of Hymenolepis tapeworm that causes hymenolepiasis. It has slightly bigger eggs and proglottids than H. nana and infects mammals using insects as intermediate hosts. The adult structure is 20 to 60 cm long and the mature proglottid is similar to that of H. nana, except it is larger.

Hymenolepis diminuta is prevalent worldwide, but only a few hundred human cases have been reported. Few cases have ever been reported in Australia, United States, Spain, and Italy. In countries such as Malaysia, Thailand, Jamaica, Indonesia, the prevalence is higher.

== Life cycle ==
The cycle begins as arthropods ingest the eggs. Arthropods are then able to act as the intermediate host. When ingested, the eggs develop into cysticercoids. As shown in the CDC life cycle, oncospheres hatch and then penetrate the intestinal wall. Rodents can become infected when they eat arthropods. Humans, especially children, can ingest the arthropods as well and therefore become infected via the same mechanism. Rodents, especially rats, are definitive hosts and natural reservoirs of H. diminuta. It induces apoptosis in the intenstine's epithelial tissue. The intermediate hosts are the coprophilic arthropods (fleas, lepidoptera, and coleoptera). As the definitive host (rats) eats an infected arthropod, cysticercoids present in the body cavity transform into the adult worm. The resulting eggs are then passed through the stool. In recent findings, beetle-to-beetle transmission of H. diminuta can be seen via the feces. Additionally, more infections occur due to this mechanism of egg dispersal.

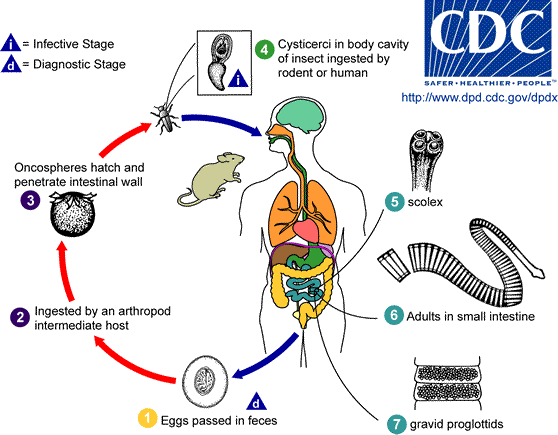
H. nana life cycle.

== Prevalence ==
Hymenolepis diminuta infection in humans is rare, typically occurring in isolated cases. As such, several studies of H. diminuta exist as case reports describing a single affected individual.

In rural Devghar, India, a place heavily infested with rodents and cockroaches, H. diminuta eggs were found in a 12-year-old girl living in a small village. In rural Talasri, Maharashtra, India, "H. diminuta" eggs were found in a 26-year-old male, living in small village, Talasri.

In an urban area of Rome, a 2-year-old boy was also infected by H. diminuta. However, in this instance, investigators found no evidence of rodent or other possible sources of infection in the places habitually occupied by the affected boy.

In 1989, a child from St. James Parish, Jamaica was the subject of the first documented case of H. diminuta occurring in Jamaica, West Indies.

== Influence on host behavior ==
In a behavioral study of the beetle Tenebrio molitor with cysticercoids of the rat tapeworm H. diminuta, findings suggested that the parasite impairs a beetle's ability to conceal itself. The study followed a rat and a beetle infected with the parasite. Infected beetles were slower than the control group; however, they still maintained the same learning level. In the initial phase of infection, the beetle was in high stress. As time progressed, this did not worsen their ability to learn. Overall, the training experiment portrayed that infected beetles were unable to hide from the rat, illustrating the high impact the parasite had on its host, the beetle.

== Role in human diseases ==
Hymenolepis diminuta is often asymptomatic. However, abdominal pain, irritability, itching, and eosinophilia are among the existing symptoms in a few of the reported cases.

Hymenolepis diminuta is a possible candidate species for helminthic therapy, i.e. the controlled use of live organism parasites for the prevention and control of diseases of modern living. These diseases include allergies, asthma, autoimmune diseases and autism spectrum disorders.

== Treatment ==
Since data regarding praziquantel treatment of H. diminuta is sparse, scientists have recommended that every case and treatment of H. diminuta be reported for development of protocols and parasitological purposes.

A 2-year-old Italian boy affected by tuberous sclerosis was infected by H. diminuta. Due to concerns over his neurological condition, the boy was treated with niclosamide rather than praziquantel. In this case, niclosamide treatment proved to be successful.
