= Coenurosis =

Parasitic disease

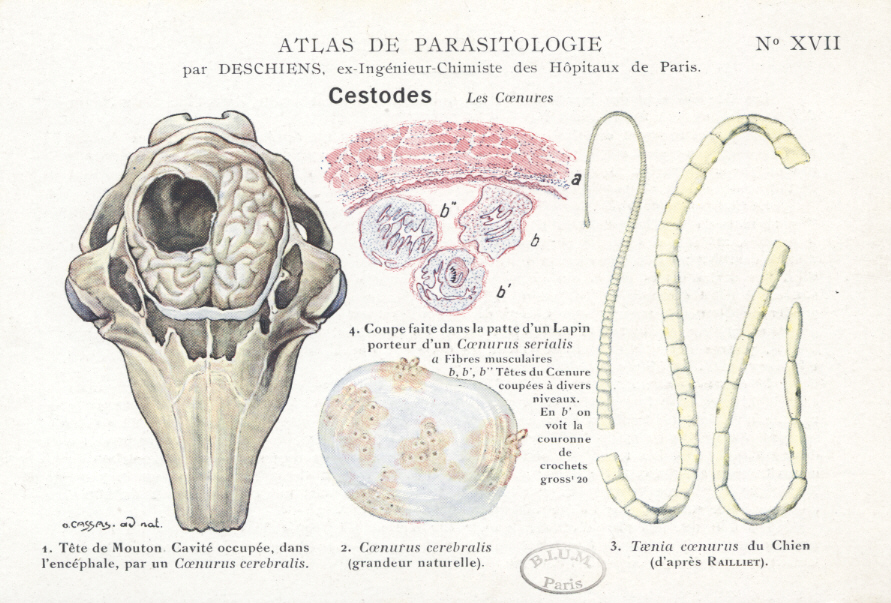
Different forms of coenurus in sheep and rabbits and an adult worm

Coenurosis, also known as caenurosis, coenuriasis, gid, dunt or sturdy, is a parasitic infection that develops in the intermediate hosts of some tapeworm species (Taenia multiceps, T. serialis, T. brauni, or T. glomerata). It is caused by the coenurus, the larval stage of these tapeworms. The disease occurs mainly in sheep and other ungulates, but it can also occur in humans by accidental ingestion of tapeworm eggs.

Adult worms of these species develop in the small intestine of the definitive hosts (dogs, foxes and other canids), causing a disease from the group of taeniasis. Humans cannot be definitive hosts for these species of tapeworms.

== History ==
The texts of Hippocrates describe a nervous disease of sheep consistent with the symptoms of gid, comparing its symptoms to epilepsy and describing the accumulation of bad-smelling fluid in the brain. However, it was only in the 1600s that clearer behavioural and necropsy descriptions were recorded, including the characteristic brain cysts and early surgical methods of removal. The cause of these cysts was identified as an animal parasite in 1780 by Nathanael Gottfried Leske and Johann August Ephraim Goeze. It was shown that the parasite could be transferred across species to and from dogs by Karl Theodor Ernst von Siebold and Friedrich Küchenmeister in the 1850s, and the species was identified as Taenia multiceps (then called Coenurus cerebralis) in 1890.

Coenurosis in humans is rare and was not diagnosed until the twentieth century, with the first recorded cases by each Taenia species being: T. multiceps in 1913, T. glomerate in 1919, T. serialis in 1933, and T. brauni in 1956.

== Life cycle ==
The eggs of T. multiceps, T. glomerate, T. serialis, and T. brauni are shed in the feces of infected hosts into the environment. The eggs are then ingested by an intermediate host, where the eggs hatch in intestines and release oncospheres. Oncospheres are the larval form of tapeworms that contain hooks for attaching to the host's tissues. The oncospheres continue to move through the bloodstream of the intermediate host until they find suitable organs to inhabit. The oncospheres can bind to the eyes, the brain, skeletal muscle, and subcutaneous tissue. Once the oncospheres reach their destination, they take about three months to develop into coenuri. Coenuri are white, fluid filled structures that are 3-10 centimeters in diameter. Coenuri have a collapsed membrane and several protoscolices on the interior. The coenuri cysts found in the central nervous system have multiple cavities, and those that are not have only one cavity. The disease is transferred to the definitive host when the host digests the tissue of the intermediate host. Next, eggs hatch in the intestine of the definitive host and circulate in the bloodstream until they reach suitable organs.

=== Hosts ===
The definitive hosts for coenurosis are dogs, foxes, and other canids. The intermediate hosts for coenurosis can vary depending on the Taenia species. In T. multiceps, sheep are the intermediate hosts, but goats, cattle, horses, and antelopes are also common hosts. T. multiceps can affect any tissue, but it normally targets the brain in animal hosts. In T. serialis, rabbits and rodents are the intermediate hosts. T. serialis commonly targets subcutaneous and intramuscular tissue. In T. brauni and T. glomerata, gerbils are the intermediate host. T. brauni and T. glomerate larvae tend to inhabit the muscles. Intermediate hosts can be infected with either chronic or acute coenurosis. Chronic coenurosis is the more common form, and it occurs primarily in young sheep.

=== In wild animals ===
Although coenurosis is more commonly associated with domestic animals, it has also been documented in wildlife, such as in mountain ungulates in the French Alps. It is believed that the ungulates are being contaminated by infected sheep. Understanding how this disease is transmitted from sheep to wild animals is important in managing the spread of this potentially dangerous zoonotic disease. A potential management strategy would be for farmers to dispose of animal carcasses found on their land. In Ethiopia, gelada monkeys with coenurosis were found to have higher mortality and lower reproductive success.

== Symptoms and diagnosis ==
The symptoms for coenurosis vary depending on where the cyst is located.

== Prevention and treatment ==
In sheep, the usual treatment is surgical trepanation to remove the brain cyst, one of the few economically viable surgeries in farm animals. The site of the cyst can usually be estimated based on the neurological symptoms and skull thinning. Treated sheep typically regain sufficient function to rejoin the flock and necropsy indicates that the site of the cyst collapses and scars, relieving pressure on the brain.

In the rare cases where a human is infected, both surgical and pharmaceutical treatments are available. Since the disease is so uncommon in humans, no vaccine has been developed for it.

== Epidemiology ==
- T. multiceps is commonly found in France, England, Brazil, Africa, and the United States.
- T. serialis is found in Canada and the United States
- T. brauni is found in North America, Rwanda, and the Republic of Congo
- T. glomerata is found in Nigeria and the Republic of Congo

== See also ==
- Coenurosis in humans
- Taeniasis
