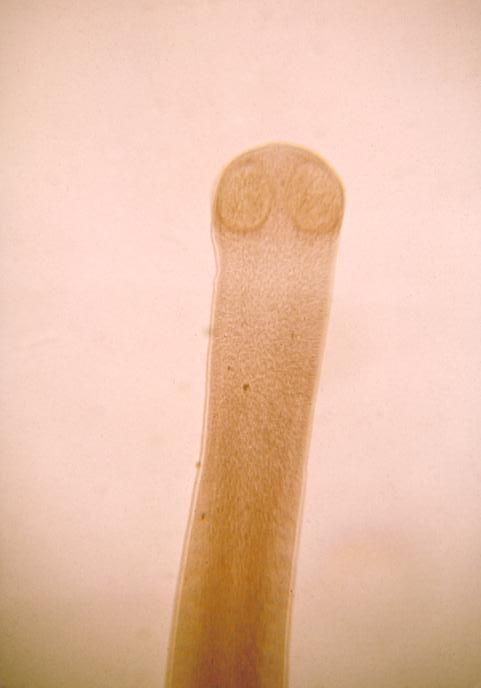
- Anterior end of rat tapeworm adult (Hymenolepis diminuta)

Scientific classification
- Kingdom: Animalia
- Phylum: Platyhelminthes
- Class: Cestoda
- Order: Cyclophyllidea
- Family: Hymenolepididae
- Genus: Hymenolepis; Weinland, 1858

= Hymenolepis (flatworm) =

Genus of flatworms

Hymenolepis is a genus of cyclophyllid tapeworms that cause hymenolepiasis. They parasitise mammals, including humans. Some notable species are:

- Hymenolepis apodemi - in rodents
- Hymenolepis asymetrica — in rodents
- Hymenolepis diminuta — in humans
- Hymenolepis horrida — in rodents
- Hymenolepis rymzhanovi — in rodents
- Hymenolepis microstoma — in rodents
- Hymenolepis nana — in humans
- Hymenolepis tualatinensis — in rodents

== Disease ==
=== Signs and symptoms ===
Most infected humans have a low number of worms and therefore are asymptomatic. Patients with more than 15,000 eggs per gram of stool may experience cramps, diarrhea, irritability, anorexia, or enteritis caused by cysticercoids destroying the intestinal villi in which they develop.

=== Diagnosis ===
Diagnosis for hymenolepiasis is done by examining stool for eggs. The proglottids that are disintegrated in the intestine cannot be detected. Egg output can be sporadic so a couple of stool tests a few days apart may be needed to diagnose the infection.

=== Treatment ===
Different Hymenolepis spp. can be treated with different anthelmintics. These treatments include albendazole, niclosamide, and praziquantel.

=== Epidemiology ===
Prevalence of Hymenolepis infections in endemic areas can reach 20%. H. nana is the most common cestode in humans with infection prevalence highest among children and in warm arid climates with poor sanitation facilities. Case studies from different continents suggest that H. nana is difficult to eliminate. The prevalence of H. nana in remote communities in northwest Australia is very high, 55%. The transmission is due mostly from human to human contact and auto-infection. In Bat Dambang, Cambodia, middle school students were found to have higher Hymenolepis prevalence than younger children, suggesting children are not learning prevention techniques as they mature. Turkish children living shanty towns have higher prevalence than those in school provide apartments, with similar infection rates between boys and girls. In rural Mexico, 25% of the children aged 6–10 in twelve schools were infected with H. nana. Socio-economic factors and lack of parent education are strong influences on the high prevalence rate. While in Zimbabwe, H. nana infections occur in children in small towns and high-density suburbs. Infections are more frequent in younger children who live in urban areas and in older children who live in rural locations. Overall prevalence was 24% in urban areas, and 18% in rural towns. In a study of six communities along the banks of Lake Titicaca, the prevalence of H. nana was 6.6%. The overall intestinal pathogenic infection prevalence rate was 91.2%, with many subjects having up to 5 different types of parasites.

== Biology ==
Hymenolepiasis is the most common cestode infection in humans, children are more commonly infected than adults. It is most widespread in warm climates. Under unsanitary conditions, eggs can be passed through faecal matter from an infected person to uninfected persons.

Hymenolepiasis is caused by either H. nana or H. diminuta. A member of the cestode class, tapeworms do not have digestive tracts to absorb nutrients, instead their surface body layer is metabolically active with nutrients and waste passing in and out continuously. In contrast, the nematodes class, such as hookworms, have complete digestive tracts and separate orifices for food ingestion and waste excretion. Although the cestode life cycle requires the cysticercoid, or larval, phase to be developed in an intermediate host, H. nana does not follow this observation and can use an intermediate host or auto infect the human host.

== Life cycle ==
Like many cestodes, Hymonolepis spp. generally have a life cycle including an intermediate and a definitive host. Intermediate host species include rodents and beetles. Hymenolepis nana can, however, either use an intermediate host, such as a rat, or be transmitted directly from human to human. This indicates that this species is in the process of evolving an abbreviate life cycle.

Human infection can occur through the ingestion of eggs with food or water, or through ingestion of contaminated cereal of flour containing infected beetles. Furthermore, infections could arise from infected pets from pet stores.

== Morphology ==
Hymenolepis nana worms are flat and segmented with skinny necks. They vary in length from approximately 15 to 40 mm and are 1 mm wide. Each worm has a scolex, which is an anterior "head" segment with a single row of 20-30 retractable hooks (rostellum). Each worm also has proglottids, which are wider segments of the tapeworm that contains both male and female reproductive organs. Each mature segment has unilateral genital pores and 3 testes. When the eggs have been fertilized the segments are referred to as gravid. These break off from the main portion, the strobila, and deteriorate releasing eggs. The oncospheres, or embryos, can be from 30-47 μm in diameter and are covered with a thin hyaline outer membrane and a thicker inner membrane. Embedded in the inner membrane on polar sides of the oncosphere are a number of hair-like filaments.

Hymenolepis diminuta worms are the same shape as H. nana but are much larger, up to 90 cm long and 44 mm wide. Their scolex does not have hooked rostellum like the H. nana species but they do have similar unilateral genital pores and 3 testes per proglottid. The oncospheres of H. diminuta are similar to H. nana's except they lack hair like filaments embedded in their inner membrane and are two times their size.

== History ==
Hymenolepis nana was first identified as a human parasite by Von Siebold in 1852. In 1906, Stiles identified an identical parasite with a rodent host and named it Hymenolepis fraterna. Later, morphological characteristics were used for taxonomy identification and H. nana was known to have hooks and linear reproductive organs. H. diminuta has no hooks and reproductive organs arranged in a triangular formation.
