= Taenia serialis =

Scientific classification
- Kingdom: Animalia
- Phylum: Platyhelminthes
- Class: Cestoda
- Order: Cyclophyllidea
- Family: Taeniidae
- Genus: Taenia
- Species: T. serialis

Binomial name
- Taenia serialis (Gervais, 1847) Baillet, 1863

Species of flatworm

Taenia serialis, also known as a canid tapeworm, is found within canines such as foxes and dogs. Adult T. serialis are parasites of carnivores, particularly dogs, with herbivorous lagomorph mammals such as rabbits and hares, serving as intermediate hosts. In definitive hosts, T. serialis is acquired by eating tissues from a variety of intermediate hosts. Accidental infection of humans though, can occur when eggs are ingested from food or water contaminated with dog feces and the human then becomes the T. serialis intermediate host.

Hatching of the T. serialis usually occurs only if the eggs have been exposed to gastric secretions proceeded by intestinal secretions. The oncospheres hatch in the intestine, invade the intestinal wall, and are carried in the blood throughout the tissues. Within the tissues, the larvae (also called metacestodes) develop into cysticerci or coenuri, which are larvae that group within cysts.

The infection with the metacestode larval form (coenurus) of T. serialis is called coenurosis. When humans ingest these eggs from definitive host remains, the eggs develop into coenuri. These coenuri can occur in humans within their muscles, brain, eye, or subcutaneous connective tissue though humans are neither the definitive nor intermediate hosts of the T. serialis. The symptoms are variable, and depend on the location and number of larvae. Epsiprantel, praziquantel, fenbendazole and surgical removal are used to combat coenuri infection but discretion should be used when treating this evolving cestode of medical importance.

== Morphology ==
The eggs of T. serialis are spherical and are 32 to 38 μm in diameter. The larvae form bladders called Coenurus metacestode that can grow to be as large as 10 cm in the intermediate hosts. The larvae are white and can mature to 40 mm while the adult can reach lengths of up to five meters. Taenia serialis is morphologically very similar to Taenia multiceps; however, they infect different areas of the body. T. serialis infects the subcutaneous tissue and T. multiceps will commonly infect the eyes and brain.

== Life cycle ==
The eggs are expelled in feces of the dog and ingested by the intermediate rabbit host. In the rabbit or other accidental intermediate host the eggs hatch within the intestines then invade the intestinal wall and move into the bloodstream. The larva circulates in the blood to the central nervous system, muscles, or soft tissue where they can form a coenurus metacestode, which is the intermediate stage of the parasite. A coenurus is a fluid-filled cyst with one or more scoleces surrounded by a fibrous capsule. These normally form after three months and are a 10 cm wide lesion. These painless nodules present in the skin or subcutaneous tissue are a sign of infection and are used to diagnose a host with the parasite. Once the Coenurus metacestode has been consumed by the fox or dog, it completes its metamorphosis into an adult tapeworm. In the canid, the worm attaches to the intestine and feeds of the food that the host ingests. There the worm matures and can become as long as 5 metres (16 ft). The adult cestode produces eggs which are spread into the environment by the feces of the definitive host. This life cycle is also very similar to T. pisiformis a canine and rabbit infecting parasite; however, T. pisiformis infects the body cavity of the rabbit and T. serialis infects muscle and subcutaneous tissue.

== Treatment ==
Treating the lesions can be done with surgery or medicine. Oral praziquantel can be used to kill coenuri; however, the dead parasite will cause a large inflammatory response in the host. The inflammation can be managed with the use of corticosteroids. In many cases surgical removal of the coenurus is a safer option with leakage of fluid from the cyst during surgery being unlikely to cause a new cyst and surgical excision is often curative.

== Geographic distribution ==
Taenia serialis has been found in a number of locations including North America, South America, Europe and Africa.
