= Taenia multiceps =

Scientific classification
- Kingdom: Animalia
- Phylum: Platyhelminthes
- Class: Cestoda
- Order: Cyclophyllidea
- Family: Taeniidae
- Genus: Taenia
- Species: T. multiceps

Binomial name
- Taenia multiceps Leske, 1780

Species of flatworm

Taenia multiceps is an intestinal tapeworm and a cause of coenurosis.

== Ecology ==
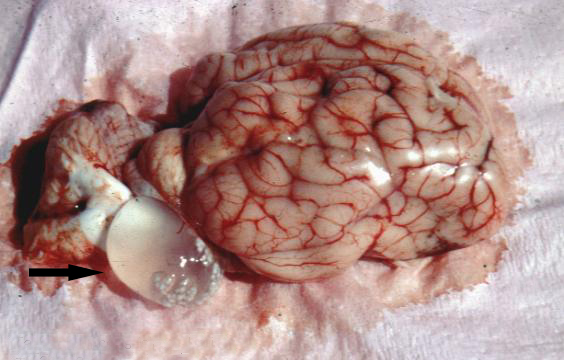
Taenia Multiceps in sheep's brain

The definitive hosts for T. multiceps are canids, while intermediate hosts are mostly cattle, although many other herbivores may serve. The larval stage is called coenurus cerebralis.

== Pathology ==
The species is one of the most common causes of disease of the central nervous system of sheep in Britain. It is absent from Australia and New Zealand.
