= Hymenolepiasis =

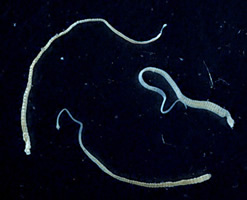
- Hymenolepis nana
- Specialty: Infectious diseases, helminthologist

Hymenolepiasis is infestation by one of two species of tapeworm: Hymenolepis nana or H. diminuta. Alternative names are dwarf tapeworm infection and rat tapeworm infection. The disease is a type of helminthiasis which is classified as a neglected tropical disease.

== Symptoms and signs ==
Hymenolepiasis does not always have symptoms, but they usually are described as abdominal pain, loss of appetite, itching around the anus, irritability, and diarrhea. However, in one study of 25 patients conducted in Peru, successful treatment of the infection made no significant difference to symptoms. Some authorities report that heavily infected cases are more likely to be symptomatic.

Symptoms in humans are due to allergic responses or systematic toxaemia caused by waste products of the tapeworm. Light infections are usually symptomless, whereas infection with more than 2000 worms can cause enteritis, abdominal pain, diarrhea, loss of appetite, restlessness, irritability, restless sleep, and anal and nasal pruritus. Rare symptoms include increased appetite, vomiting, nausea, bloody diarrhea, hives, extremity pain, headache, dizziness, and behavioral disturbances. Occasionally, epileptic seizures occur in infected children.

Examination of the stool for eggs and parasites confirms the diagnosis. The eggs and proglottids of H. nana are smaller than H. diminuta. Proglottids of both are relatively wide and have three testes. Identifying the parasites to the species level is often unnecessary from a medical perspective, as the treatment is the same for both.

=== Complications ===
Abdominal discomfort and, in case of prolonged diarrhea, dehydration are possible complications.

In 2015 an unusual complication was noted in a man whose immune system had been compromised by HIV. He developed multiple tumors of malignant cell nests within his body that had originated from a tapeworm in his intestines.

== Causes ==
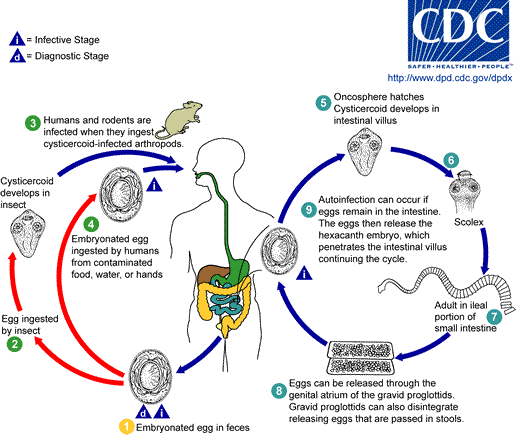
Lifecycle of H. nana

Hymenolepis worms live in the intestines of rats and are common in warm climates, and are generally found in the feces of rats, which are consumed by their secondary hosts—beetles. The worms mature into a life form referred to as a "cysticercoid" in the insect; in H. nana, the insect is always a beetle. Humans and other animals become infected when they intentionally or unintentionally eat material contaminated by insects. In an infected person, it is possible for the worm's entire lifecycle to be completed in the bowel, so infection can persist for years if left untreated. H. nana infections are much more common than H. diminuta infections in humans because, in addition to being spread by insects, the disease can be spread directly from person to person by eggs in feces. When this happens, H. nana oncosphere larvae encyst in the intestinal wall and develop into cysticercoids and then adults. These infections were previously common in the southeastern USA, and have been described in crowded environments and individuals confined to institutions. However, the disease occurs throughout the world. H. nana infections can grow worse over time because, unlike in most tapeworms, H. nana eggs can hatch and develop without ever leaving the definitive host.

== H. diminuta ==
The risk of human infection from H. diminuta is very low, since its main host is the rat. Also known as the rat tapeworm, H. diminuta adults live and mate in the bowels of rats. Eggs of H. diminuta are excreted by the rats in droppings, which are frequently consumed by beetles. Once inside the beetle, the eggs mature into a cysticercoid. The juvenile tapeworms claw their way out of the beetle gut into the circulatory system by means of their three pairs of hooks. There, they wait for a rat to ingest the host beetle, where they mature to adult form, lay eggs, and restart the entire cycle.

=== Beetle manipulation ===
H. diminuta has an effective mechanism for interspecies transfection. Beetles prefer to ingest rat droppings infected with tapeworm eggs, because of their odor. It is not known if the odor is produced specifically by the eggs or the droppings. H. diminuta also sterilizes its beetle host, if female. This is so the beetle does not waste energy in its reproductive system, allowing H. diminuta to further exploit the beetle's metabolic resources.

== H. nana ==
H. nana is a tapeworm, belonging to the class Cestoidea, phylum Platyhelminthes. It consists of a linear series of sets of reproductive organs of both sexes; each set is referred to as a genitaluim and the area around it is a proglottid. New proglottids are continuously differentiated near the anterior end in a process called strobilation. Each segment moves toward the posterior end as a new one takes its place and, during the process, becomes sexually mature. The proglottid can copulate with itself, with others in the strobilla, or with those in other worms. When the segment reaches the end of its strobila, it disintegrates en route, releasing eggs in a process called apolysis.

=== Lifecycle ===
H. nana is the only cestode capable of completing its lifecycle without an intermediate host. It can, however, pass through an intermediate host, as well. The most common intermediate hosts for H. nana are arthropods (e.g. flour beetles). When an egg is ingested by the definitive host, it hatches and releases a six-hook larva called the oncosphere (hexacanth) which penetrates the villi of the small intestine and develops into a cysticercoid.

=== Infection ===
Transmission of H.nana occurs by the fecal-oral route. It also occurs by accidental ingestion of an insect containing the cysticercoid.

=== Screening for activity against H. nana ===
Mouse models can be used to study H. nana because the human-type infection is easily maintained in mice, the armed scolex is similar to other pathogenic tapeworms, and it corresponds to other tapeworms in its sensitivity to standard anthelmintics. The method is as follows:

1. Mature worms are collected from infected mice.
2. Terminal gravid proglottids are removed, crushed under cover slips, and eggs are removed.
3. Eggs containing hooklets (mature) are counted.
4. 0.2 millilitres (0.012 cu in) stock solution containing ~200 eggs given to each mouse.
5. Adult worms develop in 15–17 days.
6. The test drug is given orally; mice are necropsied on the third day after treatment.
7. A standard drug is given.
8. The intestines are examined under a dissecting microscope for worms or scolices.
9. The response is measured by the number mice cleared.

== Pathology ==
H. nana lodges itself in the intestines and absorbs nutrients from the intestinal lumen. In human adults, the tapeworm is more of a nuisance than a health problem, but in small children, many H. nana worms can be dangerous. Usually, the larvae of this tapeworm cause the most problem in children; they burrow into the walls of the intestine, and if enough tapeworms are present in the child, severe damage can be inflicted. This is done by absorbing all the nutrients from the food the child eats. Usually, a single tapeworm will not cause health issues. H. nana usually will not cause deaths unless in extreme circumstances and usually in young children or in people who have weakened immune systems. In some parts of the world, individuals who are heavily infected are a result of internal autoinfection.

== Prevention ==
Good hygiene, public health and sanitation programs, and elimination of infected rats help to prevent the spread of hymenolepiasis. Preventing fecal contamination of food and water in institutions and crowded areas is of primary importance. General sanitation and rodent and insect control (especially control of fleas and grain insects) are also essential for prevention of H. nana infection.

== Treatment ==
The two drugs that have been well-described for the treatment of hymenolepiasis are praziquantel and niclosamide. Praziquantel, which is parasiticidal in a single dose for all the stages of the parasite, is the drug of choice because it acts very rapidly against H. nana. Although structurally unrelated to other anthelminthics, it kills both adult worms and larvae. In vitro, the drug produces vacuolization and disruption of the tegument in the neck of the worms, but not in more posterior portions of the strobila. Praziquantel is well absorbed when taken orally, and it undergoes first-pass metabolism and 80% of the dose is excreted as metabolites in urine within 24 hours. Repeated treatment is required for H. nana at an interval of 7–10 days.

Praziquantel as a single dose (25 mg/kg) is the current treatment of choice for hymenolepiasis and has an efficacy of 96%. Single-dose albendazole (400 mg) is also very efficacious (>95%).

A three-day course of nitazoxanide is 75–93% efficacious. The dose is 1 g daily for adults and children over 12; 400 mg daily for children aged 4 to 11 years; and 200 mg daily for children aged 3 years or younger.

== Prognosis ==
Cure rates are extremely good with modern treatments, but successful cure results may be of no symptomatic benefit to patients.

== See also ==
- List of parasites (human)
