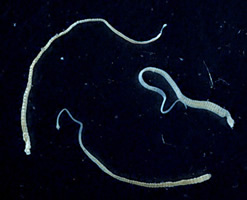
- Three adult Hymenolepis nana

Scientific classification
- Kingdom: Animalia
- Phylum: Platyhelminthes
- Class: Cestoda
- Order: Cyclophyllidea
- Family: Hymenolepididae

Genera
- Many, see text

= Hymenolepididae =

Family of flatworms

The Hymenolepididae are family of cyclophyllid tapeworms. Their characteristic feature is the small number of testes (one to four). The unilateral genital pores and large external seminal vesicle allow for easy recognition. Most species are small, transparent, and easy to study. The family contains over 90 genera with over 900 species, having as their definitive host birds (c. 700 species) or mammals (about 250 species). Most reside in the intestines of their definitive hosts. The majority of species with known lifecycles have arthropods as intermediate hosts.

== Hymenolepiasis ==
The family Hymenolepididae has only two species which infects humans: the disease hymenolepiasis is caused by Hymenolepis nana and H. diminuta, which are sometimes classified in the genus Rodentolepis.

Most cases of hymenolepiasis are caused by H. nana. It occurs worldwide, but in temperate climates, children and people living in institutions are more likely to be infected. A morphologically-identical variety of H. nana, H. nana var. fraterna infects rodents, but the human strain of H. nana is essentially non-infective to rodents. Unlike most tapeworms, including H. diminuta, H. nana can complete its lifecycle without an intermediate host. Pathological effects of infection are rare and occur in massive infections through autoinfection, where the parasite is able to complete its lifecycle within the intestine of the human host, without passing through an intermediate host outside the body. With increasing worm burden, symptoms such as restlessness, irritability, diarrhea, and abdominal pain occur.

H. diminuta is primarily a parasite of rats, but human infections occur as incidental hosts. It is a larger species than H. nana and lacks hooks on the rostellum; it has three testes per proglottid. Species from a diverse set of arthropod taxa, including earwigs, butterflies, and beetles, can be intermediate hosts for this species, which is unusual for a tapeworm. Grain beetles are common intermediate hosts, because they live in piles of grain where they can be ingested by rats, which are the definitive hosts.

Drugs commonly used for treatment of hymenolepiasis are praziquantel, niclosamide, and paromomycin.

== Selected genera ==
- Allohymenolepis
- Amphipetrovia
- Aploparaxis
- Armadolepis
- Brachylepis
- Branchiopodataenia
- Cladogynia
- Cloacotaenia
- Colibrilepis
- Confluaria
- Coronacanthus
- Dicranotaenia
- Dildotaenia
- Diorchis
- Diploposthe
- Dollfusilepis
- Drepanidotaenia
- Echinolepis
- Fimbriaria
- Flamingolepis
- Hilmylepis
- Hsuolepis
- Hymenolepis (sometimes included in Rodentolepis)
- Mathevolepis
- Passerilepis
- Potorolepis
- Pseudhymenolepis
- Retinometra
- Rodentolepis
- Soricinia
- Staphylocystis
- Triodontolepis
- Vampirolepis
- Variolepis
- Wardium
