= C11H8O3 =

The molecular formula C_{11}H_{8}O_{3} (molar mass: 188.18 g/mol, exact mass: 188.0473 u) may refer to:

- 3-Acetylcoumarin
- Hydroxynaphthoic acids
  - 2-Hydroxy-1-naphthoic acid
  - 3-Hydroxy-2-naphthoic acid
- Plumbagin, or 5-hydroxy-2-methyl-1,4-naphthoquinone
