= JWH-249 =

Chemical compound

Legal status
- Legal status: CA: Schedule II; DE: NpSG (Industrial and scientific use only); UK: Under Psychoactive Substances Act; US: Schedule I

Identifiers
- IUPAC name: 2-(2-Bromophenyl)-1-(1-pentylindol-3-yl)ethanone
- CAS Number: 864445-60-3
- PubChem CID: 44397335
- ChemSpider: 23253217
- UNII: H988KQV4U9
- ChEMBL: ChEMBL363471
- CompTox Dashboard (EPA): DTXSID30658735

Chemical and physical data
- Formula: C_{21}H_{22}BrNO
- Molar mass: 384.317 g·mol^{−1}
- 3D model (JSmol): Interactive image
- SMILES: CCCCCn1cc(c2c1cccc2)C(=O)Cc3ccccc3Br
- InChI: InChI=1S/C21H22BrNO/c1-2-3-8-13-23-15-18(17-10-5-7-12-20(17)23)21(24)14-16-9-4-6-11-19(16)22/h4-7,9-12,15H,2-3,8,13-14H2,1H3; Key:CGQRVOHECAULLB-UHFFFAOYSA-N

JWH-249 (1-pentyl-3-(2-bromophenylacetyl)indole) is a synthetic cannabinoid from the phenylacetylindole family, which acts as a cannabinoid agonist with about 2.4 times selectivity for CB_{1} with a K_{i} of 8.4 ± 1.8 nM and 20 ± 2 nM at CB_{2}. Similar to the related 2'-methoxy compound JWH-250, the 2'-chloro compound JWH-203, and the 2'-methyl compound JWH-251, JWH-249 has a phenylacetyl group in place of the naphthoyl ring used in most aminoalkylindole cannabinoid compounds.

In the United States, CB_{1} receptor agonists of the 3-phenylacetylindole class such as cannabipiperidiethanone are Schedule I Controlled Substances.

== See also ==
- AM-679
