= JWH-251 =

Names
- Preferred IUPAC name 2-(2-Methylphenyl)-1-(1-pentyl-1H-indol-3-yl)ethan-1-one

Identifiers
| CAS Number | 864445-39-6 |
| 3D model (JSmol) | Interactive image |
| ChEMBL | ChEMBL364820 |
| ChemSpider | 9791472 |
| PubChem CID | 11616723 |
| UNII | 55H9NDH32M |
| CompTox Dashboard (EPA) | DTXSID80235555 |
- InChI: InChI=1S/C22H25NO/c1-3-4-9-14-23-16-20(19-12-7-8-13-21(19)23)22(24)15-18-11-6-5-10-17(18)2/h5-8,10-13,16H,3-4,9,14-15H2,1-2H3 Key: YBIPNGRKUAVSBG-UHFFFAOYSA-N
- SMILES: O=C(c2c1ccccc1n(c2)CCCCC)Cc3ccccc3C

Properties
| Chemical formula | C_{22}H_{25}NO |
| Molar mass | 319.448 g·mol^{−1} |

Pharmacology
| Legal status | BR: Class F2 (Prohibited psychotropics); DE: Anlage II; US: Schedule I |
- Except where otherwise noted, data are given for materials in their standard state (at 25 °C [77 °F], 100 kPa). verify (what is ?) Infobox references

JWH-251 (1-pentyl-3-(2-methylphenylacetyl)indole) is a synthetic cannabinoid from the phenylacetylindole family, which acts as a cannabinoid agonist with about five times selectivity for CB_{1} with a K_{i} of 29 nM and 146 nM at CB_{2}. Similar to the related 2'-methoxy compound JWH-250, the 2'-chloro compound JWH-203, and the 2'-bromo compound JWH-249, JWH-251 has a phenylacetyl group in place of the naphthoyl ring used in most aminoalkylindole cannabinoid compounds.

In the United States, all CB_{1} receptor agonists of the 3-phenylacetylindole class such as JWH-251 are Schedule I Controlled Substances.
