= JWH-167 =

Names
- Preferred IUPAC name 1-(1-Pentyl-1H-indol-3-yl)-2-phenylethan-1-one

Identifiers
CAS Number	864445-37-4
3D model (JSmol)	Interactive image
ChEMBL	ChEMBL365878
ChemSpider	23256084
PubChem CID	44397502
UNII	LQX1W3537N
CompTox Dashboard (EPA)	DTXSID20235554
- InChI: InChI=1S/C21H23NO/c1-2-3-9-14-22-16-19(18-12-7-8-13-20(18)22)21(23)15-17-10-5-4-6-11-17/h4-8,10-13,16H,2-3,9,14-15H2,1H3 Key: AMCPOEOUXQWESI-UHFFFAOYSA-N
- SMILES: CCCCCn1cc(c2c1cccc2)C(=O)Cc3ccccc3

Properties
Chemical formula	C_{21}H_{23}NO
Molar mass	305.421 g·mol^{−1}
- Except where otherwise noted, data are given for materials in their standard state (at 25 °C [77 °F], 100 kPa). verify (what is ?) Infobox references

JWH-167 (1-pentyl-3-(phenylacetyl)indole) is a synthetic cannabinoid from the phenylacetylindole family, which acts as a cannabinoid agonist with about 1.75 times selectivity for CB_{1} with a K_{i} of 90 nM ± 17 and 159 nM ± 14 at CB_{2}. Similar to the related 2'-methoxy compound JWH-250, and the 2'-chloro compound JWH-203, JWH-167 has a phenylacetyl group in place of the naphthoyl ring used in most aminoalkylindole cannabinoid compounds.

In the United States, CB_{1} receptor agonists of the 3-phenylacetylindole class such as JWH-167 are Schedule I Controlled Substances.
