= Pamoic acid =

- Structural formula of pamoic acid

Names
- Preferred IUPAC name 4,4′-Methylenebis(3-hydroxynaphthalene-2-carboxylic acid)
- Other names 4,4′-Methylenebis(3-hydroxy-2-naphthoic acid); Embonic acid

Identifiers
CAS Number	130-85-8
3D model (JSmol)	Interactive image; Interactive image
Beilstein Reference	901319
ChEBI	CHEBI:50186
ChEMBL	ChEMBL177880
ChemSpider	8228
ECHA InfoCard	100.004.545
EC Number	204-998-0
IUPHAR/BPS	2920
MeSH	Pamoic+acid
PubChem CID	8546
RTECS number	QL2180000
UNII	7RRQ8QZ38N
CompTox Dashboard (EPA)	DTXSID9048984
- InChI: InChI=1S/C23H16O6/c24-20-16(14-7-3-1-5-12(14)9-18(20)22(26)27)11-17-15-8-4-2-6-13(15)10-19(21(17)25)23(28)29/h1-10,24-25H,11H2,(H,26,27)(H,28,29) Key: WLJNZVDCPSBLRP-UHFFFAOYSA-N
- SMILES: OC(=O)C1=CC2=CC=CC=C2C(CC2=C(O)C(=CC3=CC=CC=C23)C(O)=O)=C1O; C1=CC=C2C(=C1)C=C(C(=C2CC3=C(C(=CC4=CC=CC=C43)C(=O)O)O)O)C(=O)O

Properties
Chemical formula	C_{23}H_{16}O_{6}
Molar mass	388.375 g·mol^{−1}
Melting point	≥300 °C
log P	6.169
Acidity (pK_{a})	2.675

Hazards
- Occupational safety and health (OHS/OSH)
Main hazards	Causes skin irritation Causes serious eye irritation May cause respiratory irritation
- Except where otherwise noted, data are given for materials in their standard state (at 25 °C [77 °F], 100 kPa). Infobox references

Pamoic acid, also called embonic acid, is a 2-Naphthoic acid derivative. Salts and esters of pamoic acid are known as pamoates or embonates. It can be prepared by the reaction of 3-hydroxy-2-naphthoic acid with formaldehyde.

In pharmacology, the salt form of pamoic acid (pamoate ion) can be used as a counterion of a drug compound to affect the dissolution rate of the drug. The presence of multiple oxygen atoms enables significant hydrogen bonding to occur. Hydrogen bonds facilitate the dissolution of compounds in water. Pharmaceutical drugs formulated this way include cycloguanil pamoate, hydroxyzine pamoate, imipramine pamoate, olanzapine pamoate hydrate, oxantel pamoate, pyrantel pamoate, and pyrvinium pamoate.

Pamoic acid has agonist activity for the orphan G protein-coupled receptor GPR35 by which it activates ERK and beta-arrestin2, and causes antinociceptive activity.
