= C11H8O2 =

The molecular formula C_{11}H_{8}O_{2} (molar mass: 172.18 g/mol, exact mass: 172.0524 u) may refer to:

- 1-Naphthoic acid
- 2-Naphthoic acid
- Menadione
