= Naphthoic acid =

Naphthoic acid, also known as Naphthalenecarboxylic acid may refer to:

- 1-Naphthoic acid
- 2-Naphthoic acid
