= List of drugs used to treat schistosomiasis =

A schistosomicide is a drug used to combat schistosomiasis.

== List ==
Examples listed in MeSH include:

- amoscanate
- arteether
- artemether
- chloroxylenol
- hycanthone
- lucanthone
- metrifonate
- niridazole
- oltipraz
- oxamniquine
- praziquantel
- stibophen

== See also ==
- Schistosomiasis vaccine
