= JWH-196 =

Chemical compound

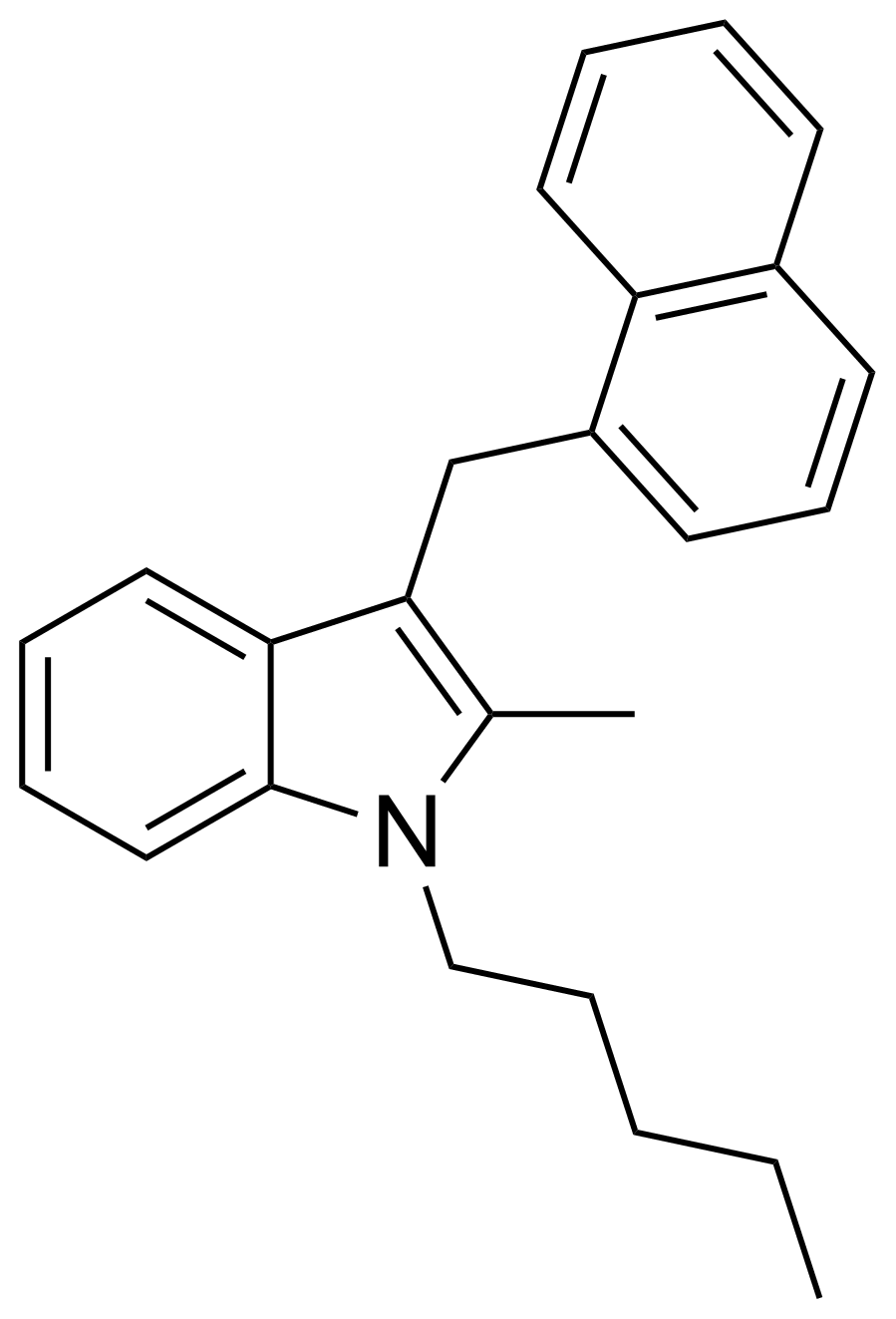

Legal status
- Legal status: UK: Class B; US: Schedule I

Identifiers
- IUPAC name: 2-Methyl-3-(1-naphthalenylmethyl)-1-pentyl-1H-Indole
- CAS Number: 619294-41-6
- ChemSpider: 35303441
- UNII: M88JKX4UVV

Chemical and physical data
- Formula: C_{25}H_{27}N
- Molar mass: 341.498 g·mol^{−1}
- 3D model (JSmol): Interactive image
- SMILES: CCCCCn1c(c(c2c1cccc2)Cc3cccc4c3cccc4)C
- InChI: InChI=1S/C25H27N/c1-3-4-9-17-26-19(2)24(23-15-7-8-16-25(23)26)18-21-13-10-12-20-11-5-6-14-22(20)21/h5-8,10-16H,3-4,9,17-18H2,1-2H3; Key:LDTJKFUAZQDSQS-UHFFFAOYSA-N

JWH-196 is a synthetic cannabinoid receptor ligand from the naphthylmethylindole family. It is the indole 2-methyl derivative of related compound JWH-175, and the carbonyl reduced analog of JWH-007. The binding affinity of JWH-196 for the CB_{1} receptor is reported as K_{i} = 151 ± 18 nM.

In the United States, all CB_{1} receptor agonists of the 3-(1-naphthylmethane)indole class such as JWH-196 are Schedule I Controlled Substances.

== See also ==
- JWH-007
- JWH-175
