= Thioxanthone =

Names
- Preferred IUPAC name 9H-Thioxanthen-9-one
- Other names Thioxanthenone; 9-Oxothioxanthene; Thioxanthen-9-one

Identifiers
CAS Number	492-22-8
3D model (JSmol)	Interactive image
ChEMBL	ChEMBL83371
ChemSpider	9873
ECHA InfoCard	100.007.046
EC Number	207-749-4
PubChem CID	10295
UNII	EOK1SAC304
CompTox Dashboard (EPA)	DTXSID8060082
- InChI: InChI=1S/C13H8OS/c14-13-9-5-1-3-7-11(9)15-12-8-4-2-6-10(12)13/h1-8H COPY Key: YRHRIQCWCFGUEQ-UHFFFAOYSA-N
- SMILES: c1ccc2c(c1)c(=O)c3ccccc3s2

Properties
Chemical formula	C_{13}H_{8}OS
Molar mass	212.27 g·mol^{−1}
Appearance	Pale yellow solid
Melting point	211 °C (412 °F; 484 K)
Boiling point	273 °C (523 °F; 546 K) (940 hPa)
Solubility in water	Nearly insoluble
Solubility in sulfuric acid	Soluble
Magnetic susceptibility (χ)	−130·10^{−6} cm^{3}/mol
- Except where otherwise noted, data are given for materials in their standard state (at 25 °C [77 °F], 100 kPa). Infobox references

Thioxanthone is a heterocyclic compound that is a sulfur analog of xanthone.

Thioxanthone can be prepared by the reaction of diphenyl sulfide with phosgene in the presence of catalytic aluminium chloride. This synthesis can be seen as a special case of the Friedel-Crafts acylation. The reduction product is thioxanthene.

Thioxanthone dissolves in concentrated sulfuric acid to give a yellow colored liquid with intense green fluorescence. A mixture of the thioxanthone derivatives of 2- and 4-isopropylthioxanthone (ITX) is used in the printing industry. Pharmaceutical drugs that are derivatives of thioxanthone include hycanthone and lucanthone.
