= C19H24N2O2 =

The molecular formula C_{19}H_{24}N_{2}O_{2} may refer to:

- Arpraziquantel
- Praziquantel, a medication used to treat types of parasitic worm infections
- Xylamidine, an amidine drug
