= C21H23NO =

The molecular formula C_{21}H_{23}NO (molar mass: 305.41 g/mol, exact mass: 305.1780 u) may refer to:

- Dapoxetine
- Indapyrophenidone
- JWH-167 (1-pentyl-3-(phenylacetyl)indole)
