= JWH-203 =

Chemical compound

Legal status
- Legal status: CA: Schedule II; DE: Anlage II (Authorized trade only, not prescriptible); UK: Class B; US: Schedule I; I-N (Poland)

Identifiers
- IUPAC name: 2-(2-Chlorophenyl)-1-(1-pentylindol-3-yl)ethanone
- CAS Number: 864445-54-5 (JWH-203) 864445-55-6 (JWH-204)
- PubChem CID: 44397500
- ChemSpider: 23256082
- UNII: 52CP80V8FY
- CompTox Dashboard (EPA): DTXSID00235557
- ECHA InfoCard: 100.233.381

Chemical and physical data
- Formula: C_{21}H_{22}ClNO
- Molar mass: 339.86 g·mol^{−1}
- 3D model (JSmol): Interactive image
- SMILES: Clc2ccccc2CC(=O)c1cn(CCCCC)c3ccccc13
- InChI: InChI=1S/C21H22ClNO/c1-2-3-8-13-23-15-18(17-10-5-7-12-20(17)23)21(24)14-16-9-4-6-11-19(16)22/h4-7,9-12,15H,2-3,8,13-14H2,1H3; Key:YDINKDBAZJOSLV-UHFFFAOYSA-N

JWH-203 (1-pentyl-3-(2-chlorophenylacetyl)indole) is an analgesic chemical from the phenylacetylindole family that acts as a cannabinoid agonist with approximately equal affinity at both the CB_{1} and CB_{2} receptors, having a K_{i} of 8.0 nM at CB_{1} and 7.0 nM at CB_{2}. It was originally discovered by, and named after, John W. Huffman, but has subsequently been sold without his permission as an ingredient of synthetic cannabis smoking blends. Similar to the related 2'-methoxy compound JWH-250, the 2'-bromo compound JWH-249, and the 2'-methyl compound JWH-251, JWH-203 has a phenylacetyl group in place of the naphthoyl ring used in most aminoalkylindole cannabinoid compounds, and has the strongest in vitro binding affinity for the cannabinoid receptors of any compound in the phenylacetyl group.

Unexpectedly despite its weaker CB_{1} K_{i} in vitro, the 2-methylindole derivative JWH-204 is actually more potent than JWH-203 in animal tests for cannabinoid activity, though it is still weaker than JWH-249.

JWH-204

== Legal status ==
In the United States, JWH-203 is a Schedule I Controlled Substance.

As of October 2015, JWH-203 is a controlled substance in China.

== See also ==
- MN-25
