= Streptomyces griseofuscus =

Scientific classification
- Domain: Bacteria
- Kingdom: Bacillati
- Phylum: Actinomycetota
- Class: Actinomycetes
- Order: Streptomycetales
- Family: Streptomycetaceae
- Genus: Streptomyces
- Species: S. griseofuscus

Binomial name
- Streptomyces griseofuscus Sakamoto et al. 1962

Type strain
- A107, ATCC 23916, BCRC 10483, CBS 837.68, CCRC 10483, CECT 3307, CEST 3307, CGMCC 4.1962, DSM 40191, DSMZ 40191, IFO 12870, IMET 42068, ISP 5191, JCM 4276, JCM 4641, KACC 20083, KCC S-0276, KCC S-0641, KCCS- 0276, KCCS-0641, KCTC 9879, Meiji Seika Co.1068, NBRC 12870, NCIB 9821, NCIMB 9821, NRRL B-5429, NRRL-ISP 5191, Oda 1068, RIA 1145, VKM Ac-1707

Species of bacterium

Streptomyces griseofuscus is a bacterium species from the genus of Streptomyces which has been isolated from soil in Japan. Streptomyces griseofuscus produces azinomycin A, azinomycin B, bundlin A, bundlin B, moldicidin A, physostigmine, fungichromin and pentamycin.

== See also ==
- List of Streptomyces species
