= Streptomyces cellulosae =

Scientific classification
- Domain: Bacteria
- Kingdom: Bacillati
- Phylum: Actinomycetota
- Class: Actinomycetes
- Order: Streptomycetales
- Family: Streptomycetaceae
- Genus: Streptomyces
- Species: S. cellulosae

Binomial name
- Streptomyces cellulosae (Krainsky 1914) Waksman and Henrici 1948 (Approved Lists 1980)

Type strain
- AS 4.1411, ATCC 25439, BCRC 12087, CBS 122.18, CBS 670.29, CBS 670.69, CCRC 12087, CGMCC 4.1411, DSM 40362, ETH 13493, IFO 13027, IFO 22027, ISP 5362, JCM 4462, KCC S-0462, KCTC 9703, Lanoot R-8676, LMG 19315, NBRC 13027, NRRL B-2889, NRRL-ISP 5362, R-8676, RIA 1219, VKM Ac-829

Synonyms
- "Actinomyces cellulosae" Krainsky 1914

Species of bacterium

Streptomyces cellulosae is a bacterium species from the genus of Streptomyces which has been isolated from garden soil . Streptomyces cellulosae produces fungichromin.

== See also ==
- List of Streptomyces species
