= C13H13N3O3 =

The molecular formula C_{13}H_{13}N_{3}O_{3} (molar mass: 259.27 g/mol, exact mass: 259.0957 u) may refer to:

- Ciclobendazole
- Lenalidomide
