= Bephenium hydroxynaphthoate =

Chemical compound

Clinical data
- Pregnancy category: Undefined
- Routes of administration: Oral
- ATC code: P02CX02 (WHO)

Pharmacokinetic data
- Bioavailability: <1%
- Excretion: Renal (negligible)

Identifiers
- IUPAC name: N-Benzyl-N,N-dimethyl-2-phenoxyethanaminium 3-hydroxynaphthalene-2-carboxylate
- CAS Number: 3818-50-6 7181-73-9 (bephenium)
- PubChem CID: 54678490
- ChemSpider: 18524
- UNII: 47RU9546DX
- ChEMBL: ChEMBL1673148
- CompTox Dashboard (EPA): DTXSID8022662
- ECHA InfoCard: 100.021.189

Chemical and physical data
- Formula: C_{28}H_{29}NO_{4}
- Molar mass: 443.543 g·mol^{−1}
- 3D model (JSmol): Interactive image
- SMILES: C[N+](C)(CCOc1ccccc1)Cc2ccccc2.c1ccc2cc(c(cc2c1)C(=O)[O-])O
- InChI: InChI=1S/C17H22NO.C11H8O3/c1-18(2,15-16-9-5-3-6-10-16)13-14-19-17-11-7-4-8-12-17;12-10-6-8-4-2-1-3-7(8)5-9(10)11(13)14/h3-12H,13-15H2,1-2H3;1-6,12H,(H,13,14)/q+1;/p-1; Key:PMPQCPQAHTXCDK-UHFFFAOYSA-M

Bephenium hydroxynaphthoate (INN, trade names Alcopara, Alcopar, Befenium, Debefenium, Francin, Nemex) is an anthelmintic agent formerly used in the treatment of hookworm infections and ascariasis. It is formulated as a salt between the active pharmaceutical ingredient, bephenium, and 3-hydroxy-2-naphthoic acid.

Bephenium is not FDA-approved and is not available in the United States.
