= Naphthol AS =

Names
- Preferred IUPAC name 3-Hydroxy-N-phenylnaphthalene-2-carboxamide
- Other names Naphtol AS, 3-hydroxy-2-naphthanilide, β-Hydroxynaphthoic anilide

Identifiers
| CAS Number | 92-77-3 |
| 3D model (JSmol) | Interactive image |
| ChemSpider | 60085 |
| ECHA InfoCard | 100.001.990 |
| EC Number | 202-188-1 |
| PubChem CID | 66719 |
| UNII | V3ZU6E76NB |
| CompTox Dashboard (EPA) | DTXSID1052618 |
- InChI: InChI=1S/C17H13NO2/c19-16-11-13-7-5-4-6-12(13)10-15(16)17(20)18-14-8-2-1-3-9-14/h1-11,19H,(H,18,20) Key: JFGQHAHJWJBOPD-UHFFFAOYSA-N
- SMILES: C1=CC=C(C=C1)NC(=O)C2=CC3=CC=CC=C3C=C2O

Properties
| Chemical formula | C_{17}H_{13}NO_{2} |
| Molar mass | 263.296 g·mol^{−1} |

Hazards
- GHS labelling
| Pictograms | (GHS07: Exclamation mark) (GHS09: Environmental hazard) |
| Signal word | Warning |
| Hazard statements | H302, H315, H317, H319, H332, H335, H411 |
| Precautionary statements | P261, P264, P270, P271, P272, P273, P280, P301+P312, P302+P352, P304+P312, P304+P340, P305+P351+P338, P312, P321, P330, P332+P313, P333+P313, P337+P313, P362, P363, P391, P403+P233, P405, P501 |
- Except where otherwise noted, data are given for materials in their standard state (at 25 °C [77 °F], 100 kPa). Infobox references

Naphthol AS is an organic compound with the formula C_{10}H_{6}(OH)C(O)NHC_{6}H_{5}. It is the anilide of 3-hydroxy-2-carboxynaphthalene. Many analogous compounds are known, designated with a differing suffix. For example, in Naphthol AS-OL, the aryl substituent on nitrogen is C_{6}H_{4}-2-OCH_{3}. These compounds are used as coupling partners in the preparation of some azo dyes.

== History ==
In 1911, it was found to be a good precursor to dyes for wool by chemists at K. Oehler Anilin- und Anilinfarbenfabrik Offenbach.
