= 1-Naphthoic acid =

Names
- Preferred IUPAC name Naphthalene-1-carboxylic acid
- Other names 1-Naphthylenecarboxylic acid α-Naphthoic acid

Identifiers
CAS Number	86-55-5
3D model (JSmol)	Interactive image
Beilstein Reference	1908896
ChEBI	CHEBI:36466
ChEMBL	ChEMBL1160
ChemSpider	6586
ECHA InfoCard	100.001.529
EC Number	201-681-9
Gmelin Reference	28651
KEGG	C14091
PubChem CID	6847
UNII	2NIV4O66BH
CompTox Dashboard (EPA)	DTXSID50861668
- InChI: InChI=1S/C11H8O2/c12-11(13)10-7-3-5-8-4-1-2-6-9(8)10/h1-7H,(H,12,13) Key: LNETULKMXZVUST-UHFFFAOYSA-N
- SMILES: C1=CC=C2C(=C1)C=CC=C2C(=O)O

Properties
Chemical formula	C_{11}H_{8}O_{2}
Molar mass	172.183 g·mol^{−1}
Appearance	White solid
Melting point	161 °C (322 °F; 434 K)

Hazards
- GHS labelling
Pictograms	(GHS07: Exclamation mark)
Signal word	Warning
Hazard statements	H315, H319, H335
Precautionary statements	P261, P264, P271, P280, P302+P352, P304+P340, P305+P351+P338, P312, P321, P332+P313, P337+P313, P362, P403+P233, P405, P501
- Except where otherwise noted, data are given for materials in their standard state (at 25 °C [77 °F], 100 kPa). Infobox references

1-Naphthoic acid is an organic compound with the formula C_{10}H_{7}CO_{2}H. It is one of two isomeric monocarboxylic acids of naphthalene, the other one being 2-naphthoic acid. In general the hydroxynaphthoic acids are more widely used than the parent naphthoic acids.

== Synthesis and reactions ==
1-Naphthoic acid can be prepared by carboxylation of the Grignard reagent generated from 1-bromonaphthalene.

1-Naphthoic acid is a substrate for C-H activation reactions.

Catalytic hydrogenation of 1-Naphthoic acid gives 1,2,3,4-Tetrahydro-1-naphthoic acid [1914-65-4]. This is used in the synthesis of Tetryzoline.

== See also ==
- Hydroxynaphthoic acids
- Classes of synthetic cannabinoids
  - Naphthoylindoles, or 3-(1-naphthoyl)indoles
  - Naphthoylpyrroles, or 3-(1-naphthoyl)pyrroles
- Natural products containing 1-naphthoic acid moiety
  - Neocarzinostatin (as 2-hydroxy-7-methoxy-5-methyl-1-naphthoate)
  - Azinomycin B (as 3-methoxy-5-methyl-1-naphthoate)
