= Oltipraz =

Chemical compound

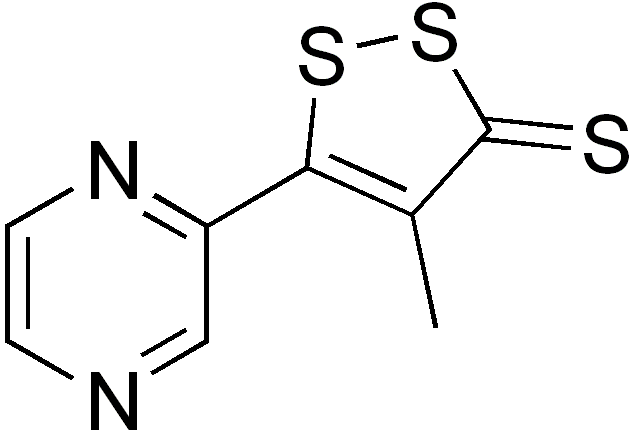

Clinical data
- ATC code: none

Identifiers
- IUPAC name: 4-methyl-5-(2-pyrazinyl)-3-dithiolethione
- CAS Number: 64224-21-1
- PubChem CID: 47318
- ChemSpider: 43066
- UNII: 6N510JUL1Y
- ChEBI: CHEBI:77319
- ChEMBL: ChEMBL178459
- CompTox Dashboard (EPA): DTXSID7021079
- ECHA InfoCard: 100.058.833

Chemical and physical data
- Formula: C_{8}H_{6}N_{2}S_{3}
- Molar mass: 226.33 g·mol^{−1}
- 3D model (JSmol): Interactive image
- SMILES: CC1=C(SSC1=S)C2=NC=CN=C2
- InChI: InChI=1S/C8H6N2S3/c1-5-7(12-13-8(5)11)6-4-9-2-3-10-6/h2-4H,1H3; Key:CKNAQFVBEHDJQV-UHFFFAOYSA-N

Oltipraz is an organosulfur compound belonging to the dithiolethione class. It acts as a schistosomicide and has been shown in rodent models to inhibit the formation of cancers in the bladder, blood, colon, kidney, liver, lung, pancreas, stomach, and trachea, skin, and mammary tissue. Clinical trials of oltipraz have failed to demonstrate efficacy and have shown significant side effects, including neurotoxicity and gastrointestinal toxicity. Oltipraz has also been shown to generate superoxide radicals, which can be toxic.
