= Streptomyces pentaticus =

Scientific classification
- Domain: Bacteria
- Kingdom: Bacillati
- Phylum: Actinomycetota
- Class: Actinomycetes
- Order: Streptomycetales
- Family: Streptomycetaceae
- Genus: Streptomyces
- Species: S. pentaticus

Binomial name
- Streptomyces pentaticus Umezawa et al. 1958

Subspecies
- Streptomyces pentaticus subsp. jenensis Fugner and Bradler

Species of bacterium

Streptomyces pentaticus is a bacterium species in the genus Streptomyces.

== Uses ==
Streptomyces pentaticus is used to produce pentamycin.
