= ATC code P02 =

ATC code P02 Anthelmintics is a therapeutic subgroup of the Anatomical Therapeutic Chemical Classification System, a system of alphanumeric codes developed by the World Health Organization (WHO) for the classification of drugs and other medical products. Subgroup P02 is part of the anatomical group P Antiparasitic products, insecticides and repellents.

National versions of the ATC classification may include additional codes not present in this list, which follows the WHO version.

== P02B Antitrematodals ==
=== P02BA Quinoline derivatives and related substances ===
P02BA01 Praziquantel
P02BA02 Oxamniquine
P02BA03 Arpraziquantel

=== P02BB Organophosphorous compounds ===
P02BB01 Metrifonate

=== P02BX Other antitrematodal agents ===
P02BX01 Bithionol
P02BX02 Niridazole
P02BX03 Stibophen
P02BX04 Triclabendazole

== P02C Antinematodal agents ==
=== P02CA Benzimidazole derivatives ===
P02CA01 Mebendazole
P02CA02 Tiabendazole
P02CA03 Albendazole
P02CA04 Ciclobendazole
P02CA05 Flubendazole
P02CA06 Fenbendazole
P02CA51 Mebendazole, combinations
P02CA53 Albendazole and ivermectin

=== P02CB Piperazine and derivatives ===
P02CB01 Piperazine
P02CB02 Diethylcarbamazine

=== P02CC Tetrahydropyrimidine derivatives ===
P02CC01 Pyrantel
P02CC02 Oxantel

=== P02CE Imidazothiazole derivatives ===
P02CE01 Levamisole

=== P02CF Avermectines ===
P02CF01 Ivermectin

=== P02CX Other antinematodals ===
P02CX01 Pyrvinium
P02CX02 Bephenium
P02CX03 Moxidectin

== P02D Anticestodals ==
=== P02DA Salicylic acid derivatives ===
P02DA01 Niclosamide

=== P02DX Other anticestodals ===
P02DX01 Desaspidin
P02DX02 Dichlorophen
