= Desaspidin =

Chemical compound

Clinical data
- ATC code: P02DX01 (WHO)

Identifiers
- IUPAC name: 2-Butanoyl-4-[(3-butanoyl-2,4-dihydroxy-6-methoxyphenyl)methyl]-3,5-dihydroxy-6,6-dimethylcyclohexa-2,4-dien-1-one
- CAS Number: 114-43-2
- PubChem CID: 8238
- ChemSpider: 10295071
- UNII: KV3495SGKS
- KEGG: D07365
- ChEMBL: ChEMBL2105606
- CompTox Dashboard (EPA): DTXSID00976317 DTXSID6074461, DTXSID00976317
- ECHA InfoCard: 100.003.680

Chemical and physical data
- Formula: C_{24}H_{30}O_{8}
- Molar mass: 446.496 g·mol^{−1}
- 3D model (JSmol): Interactive image
- SMILES: CCCC(=O)C1=C(C(=C(C=C1O)OC)CC2=C(C(C(=C(C2=O)C(=O)CCC)O)(C)C)O)O
- InChI: InChI=1S/C24H30O8/c1-6-8-14(25)18-16(27)11-17(32-5)12(20(18)28)10-13-21(29)19(15(26)9-7-2)23(31)24(3,4)22(13)30/h11,27-28,30-31H,6-10H2,1-5H3; Key:GAHOBHHMYUYJDT-UHFFFAOYSA-N

Desaspidin is an anthelmintic. Desapidin may occur in natural form within some plants such as Coastal woodfern, Dryopteris arguta. Since the 1950s the inhibition effects of desapidins upon phosphorylation in chloroplasts has been noted and studied.
