= Niridazole =

Chemical compound

Clinical data
- MedlinePlus: a682128
- ATC code: P02BX02 (WHO)

Identifiers
- IUPAC name: 1-(5-Nitro-1,3-thiazol-2-yl)imidazolidin-2-one
- CAS Number: 61-57-4
- PubChem CID: 6093
- ChemSpider: 5868
- UNII: N116U8Y5QQ
- KEGG: D05170
- CompTox Dashboard (EPA): DTXSID6045244
- ECHA InfoCard: 100.000.466

Chemical and physical data
- Formula: C_{6}H_{6}N_{4}O_{3}S
- Molar mass: 214.20 g·mol^{−1}
- 3D model (JSmol): Interactive image
- SMILES: C1CN(C(=O)N1)C2=NC=C(S2)[N+](=O)[O-]
- InChI: InChI=1S/C6H6N4O3S/c11-5-7-1-2-9(5)6-8-3-4(14-6)10(12)13/h3H,1-2H2,(H,7,11); Key:RDXLYGJSWZYTFJ-UHFFFAOYSA-N

Niridazole is a schistosomicide. It is used to treat schistosomiasis, the helmintic disease caused by certain flatworms (trematodes) from the genus Schistosoma (formerly Bilharzia). It is also known by its trade name Ambilhar. It is usually given as tablets.

Niridazole has central nervous system toxicity and can cause dangerous side effects, such as hallucinations. Also, it may cause allergic reactions in sensitive people. However, it is one of the most effective schistosomicide drugs.

It has recently also been investigated for use in the treatment of periodontitis.

== Mechanism of action ==
Niridazole is rapidly concentrated in the parasite and inhibits oogenesis and spermatogenesis. The compound also inhibits the phosphofructokinase enzyme, leading to glycogen depletion and hepatic shift.
