= Pyrvinium =

Chemical compound

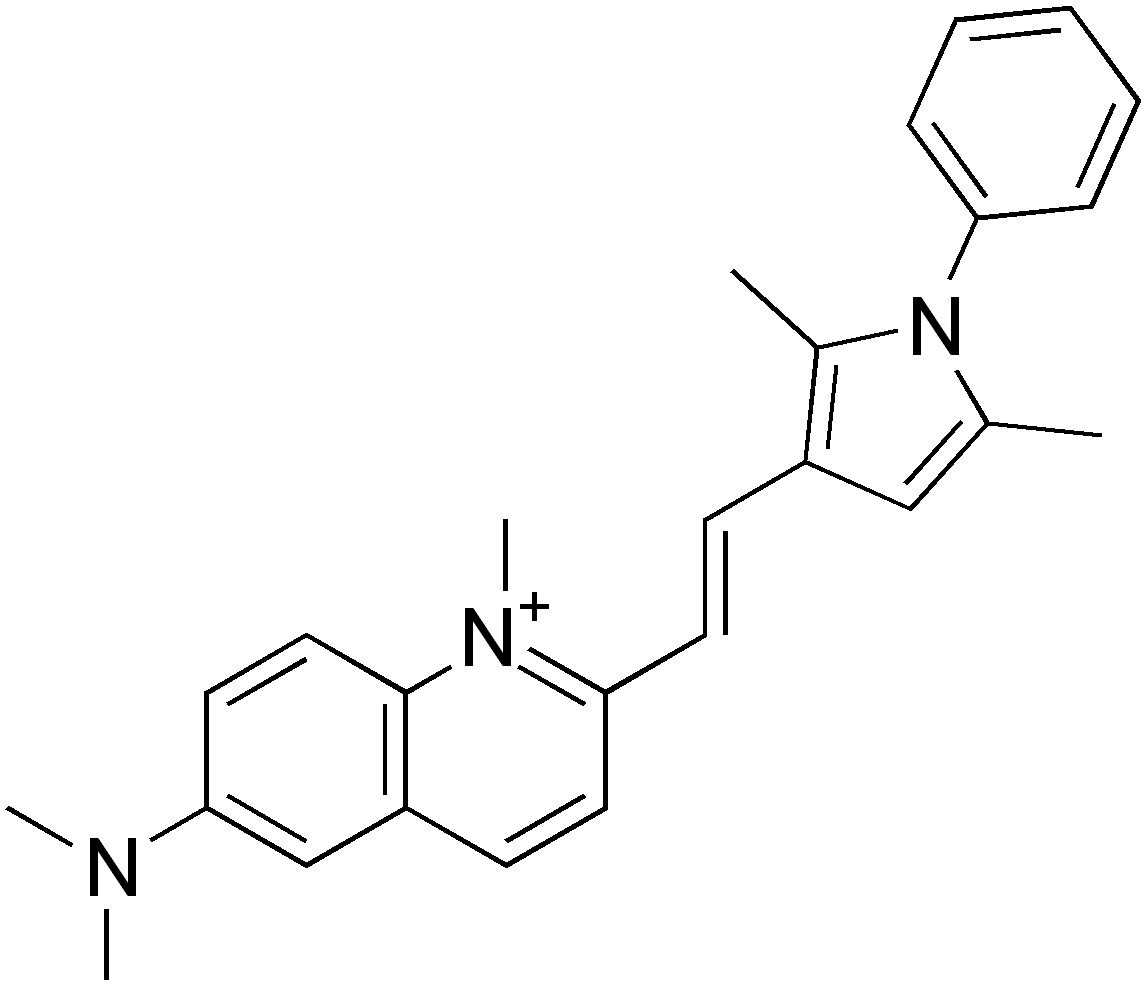

Clinical data
- AHFS/Drugs.com: Micromedex Detailed Consumer Information
- ATC code: P02CX01 (WHO)

Identifiers
- IUPAC name: 2-[(E)-2-(2,5-Dimethyl-1-phenylpyrrol-3-yl)ethenyl]-N,N,1-trimethylquinolin-1-ium-6-amine
- CAS Number: 7187-62-4
- PubChem CID: 5281035
- ChemSpider: 21125
- UNII: 6B9991FLU3
- KEGG: C07412
- ChEBI: CHEBI:8687
- ChEMBL: ChEMBL1201303
- CompTox Dashboard (EPA): DTXSID4023545
- ECHA InfoCard: 100.020.543

Chemical and physical data
- Formula: C_{26}H_{28}N_{3}^{+}
- Molar mass: 382.531 g·mol^{−1}
- 3D model (JSmol): Interactive image
- SMILES: CC1=CC(=C(N1C2=CC=CC=C2)C)/C=C/C3=[N+](C4=C(C=C3)C=C(C=C4)N(C)C)C
- InChI: InChI=1S/C26H28N3/c1-19-17-21(20(2)29(19)24-9-7-6-8-10-24)11-13-23-14-12-22-18-25(27(3)4)15-16-26(22)28(23)5/h6-18H,1-5H3/q+1; Key:QMHSXPLYMTVAMK-UHFFFAOYSA-N

Pyrvinium (Viprynium) is an anthelmintic effective for pinworms. Several forms of pyrvinium have been prepared with variable counter anions, such as halides, tosylate, triflate and pamoate. Pyrvinium was identified as a potent Wnt inhibitor, acting through activation of Casein kinase CK1α.

Pyrvinium salts can also inhibit the growth of cancer cells. More specifically, the pamoate salt has been shown to have preferential toxicity for various cancer cell lines during glucose starvation.

== Synthesis ==
One synthetic method is based on Skraup synthesis and Paal-Knorr synthesis. More recently, an alternative convergent, synthetic strategy to pyrvinium triflate salts through Friedländer synthesis was reported.
