= 3-Acetylcoumarin =

Names
- Preferred IUPAC name 3-Acetyl-2H-1-benzopyran-2-one
- Other names 3-Acetyl-2H-chromen-2-one

Identifiers
CAS Number	3949-36-8
3D model (JSmol)	Interactive image
ChEBI	CHEBI:137384
ChEMBL	ChEMBL149463
ChemSpider	69959
ECHA InfoCard	100.021.402
EC Number	223-541-6
PubChem CID	77553
UNII	ID71XJ0D40
CompTox Dashboard (EPA)	DTXSID10192627
- InChI: InChI=1S/C11H8O3/c1-7(12)9-6-8-4-2-3-5-10(8)14-11(9)13/h2-6H,1H3 Key: CSPIFKKOBWYOEX-UHFFFAOYSA-N
- SMILES: CC(=O)C1=CC2=CC=CC=C2OC1=O

Properties
Chemical formula	C_{11}H_{8}O_{3}
Molar mass	188.182 g·mol^{−1}
- Except where otherwise noted, data are given for materials in their standard state (at 25 °C [77 °F], 100 kPa). Infobox references

3-Acetylcoumarin has the molecular formula C_{11}H_{8}O_{3} and is also identified as 3-acetylchromen-2-one. 3-Acetylcoumarin has a molecular weight of 188.18 g/mol and a melting point of 119-122 °C. 3-Acetylcoumarin is thought to induce apoptosis in breast cancer cells.
