= Arpraziquantel =

Medication

Clinical data
- Other names: (R)-Praziquantel
- Drug class: Anthelmintic
- ATC code: P02BA03 (WHO)

Identifiers
- CAS Number: 57452-98-9
- PubChem CID: 445900
- DrugBank: DB11749
- ChemSpider: 393394
- UNII: WF15T5925V
- KEGG: D12741
- ChEMBL: ChEMBL1235551
- PDB ligand: PZQ (PDBe, RCSB PDB)
- CompTox Dashboard (EPA): DTXSID80904739

Chemical and physical data
- Formula: C_{19}H_{24}N_{2}O_{2}
- Molar mass: 312.413 g·mol^{−1}
- 3D model (JSmol): Interactive image
- SMILES: [H][C@@]12CN(CC(=O)N1CCC1=CC=CC=C21)C(=O)C1CCCCC1
- InChI: InChI=1S/C19H24N2O2/c22-18-13-20(19(23)15-7-2-1-3-8-15)12-17-16-9-5-4-6-14(16)10-11-21(17)18/h4-6,9,15,17H,1-3,7-8,10-13H2/t17-/m0/s1; Key:FSVJFNAIGNNGKK-KRWDZBQOSA-N

Arpraziquantel ((R)-praziquantel) is the eutomer (the biologically active enantiomer) of praziquantel, and is a medication which is currently under investigation for the treatment of schistosomiasis in young children since it has less side effects than the usual racemic mixture formulation of praziquantel.

Arpraziquantel is a therapeutic alternative on the World Health Organization's List of Essential Medicines.

== Society and culture ==
=== Legal status ===
In December 2023, the Committee for Medicinal Products for Human Use (CHMP) of the European Medicines Agency adopted a positive opinion in accordance with Article 58 of Regulation (EC) No 726/20041 for the medicinal product arpraziquantel, intended for the treatment of schistosomiasis in young children. The applicant for this medicinal product is Merck Europe B.V. It is intended exclusively for markets outside the European Union.

=== Names ===
Arpraziquantel is the International nonproprietary name.
