= Stibophen =

Chemical compound

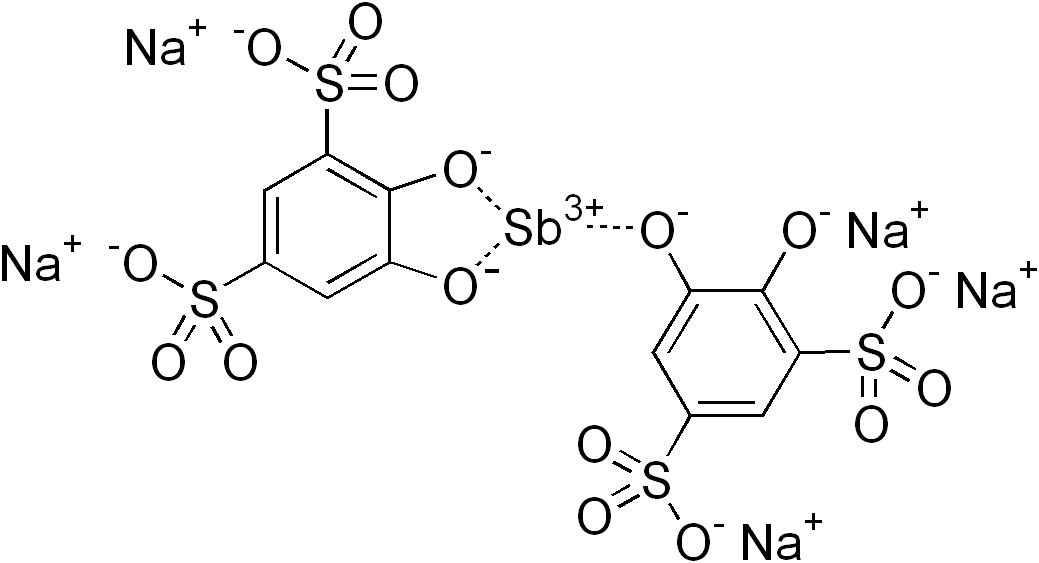

Clinical data
- ATC code: P02BX03 (WHO)

Identifiers
- IUPAC name: Pentasodium 2-(2-oxido-3,5-disulfonatophenoxy)-1,3,2-benzodioxastibole-5,7-disulfonate
- CAS Number: 23940-36-5
- PubChem CID: 16683091
- ChemSpider: 17615576
- UNII: EF31LJY4KN
- CompTox Dashboard (EPA): DTXSID10946763
- ECHA InfoCard: 100.007.630

Chemical and physical data
- Formula: C_{12}H_{4}Na_{5}O_{16}S_{4}Sb
- Molar mass: 769.10 g·mol^{−1}
- 3D model (JSmol): Interactive image
- SMILES: C1=C(C=C2C(=C1S(=O)(=O)[O-])O[Sb](O2)OC3=CC(=CC(=C3[O-])S(=O)(=O)[O-])S(=O)(=O)[O-])S(=O)(=O)[O-].[Na+].[Na+].[Na+].[Na+].[Na+]
- InChI: InChI=1S/2C6H6O8S2.5Na.7H2O.Sb/c2*7-4-1-3(15(9,10)11)2-5(6(4)8)16(12,13)14;;;;;;;;;;;;;/h2*1-2,7-8H,(H,9,10,11)(H,12,13,14);;;;;;7*1H2;/q;;5*+1;;;;;;;;+3/p-8; Key:ZDDUXABBRATYFS-UHFFFAOYSA-F

Stibophen is an anthelmintic originally developed by Bayer that is used as a treatment for schistosomiasis by intramuscular injection. It is classified as a trivalent antimony compound. Brand names include Fouadin/Fuadin (named in honor of Fuad I of Egypt, who had enthusiastically supported its research and development).

== Mechanism of action ==
Stibophen inhibits the enzyme phosphofructokinase, which the worms need for glycolysis, at least partly by binding to the thiol (–SH) group of the enzyme. Inhibiting glycolysis paralyzes the worms, which lose their hold on the wall of mesenteric veins and undergo hepatic shift, die, and are phagocytosed by liver cells.
