= Structural scheduling of synthetic cannabinoids =

To combat the illicit synthetic cannabinoid industry many jurisdictions have created a system to control these cannabinoids through their general (or Markush) structure as opposed to their specific identity. In this way new analogs are already controlled before they are even created. A large number of cannabinoids have been grouped into classes based on similarities in their chemical structure, and these classes have been widely adopted across a variety of jurisdictions.

Typical groups of compounds included for control may include naphthoylindoles, phenylacetylindoles, benzoylindoles, cyclohexylphenols, naphthylmethylindoles, naphthoylpyrroles, naphthylmethylindenes, indole-3-carboxamides, indole-3-carboxylates, indazole-3-carboxamides and sometimes others, each with specific substitutions on specific atoms of the molecule. The scope of definitions and the range of compounds included may vary substantially between jurisdictions, so compounds which are legal in one country or state may be illegal in another.

For example, in many jurisdictions there is a general control on naphthoylindoles: "Any compound containing a 3-(1-naphthoyl)indole structure with substitution at the nitrogen atom of the indole ring by an alkyl, haloalkyl, alkenyl, cycloalkylmethyl, cycloalkylethyl, 1-(N-methyl-2-piperidinyl)methyl, or 2-(4-morpholinyl)ethyl group, whether or not further substituted in the indole ring to any extent and whether or not substituted in the naphthyl ring to any extent" (example definition from Kentucky, which is substantially derived from the 2009 ACMD advice on synthetic cannabinoids in the UK) This causes a substance such as MAM-2201 to be controlled as a Schedule 1 illegal drug, even though "MAM-2201" or its corresponding chemical name are not specifically listed in the statute.

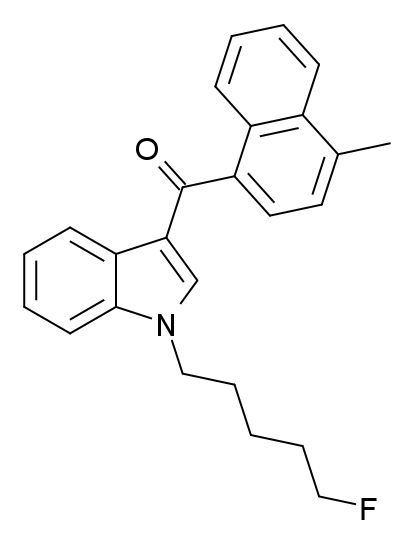
MAM-2201

In the five carbon chain, the fluorine atom is attached to the nitrogen atom. A fluoropentyl chain falls within the scope of "haloalkyl" substitutions, and so with a methyl group attached to the carbon atom at the four-position of the naphthyl ring (i.e. "substituted in the naphthyl ring to any extent"), and a fluoropentyl group attached to the nitrogen atom ("with substitution at the nitrogen atom of the indole ring by [a]...haloalkyl...group"), this compound falls within the scope of the general definition. It is in this way MAM-2201 can be controlled without being specifically named in the statute. On the other hand, THJ-2201 with an indazole core, falls outside this general definition, as it is a naphthoylindazole rather than a naphthoylindole. Note however that THJ-2201 is now specifically listed under US federal law.

== Common examples of general controls ==
Naphthoylindoles: Any compound containing a 3-(1-naphthoyl)indole structure with substitution at the nitrogen atom of the indole ring by an alkyl, haloalkyl, alkenyl, cycloalkylmethyl, cycloalkylethyl, 1-(N-methyl-2-piperidinyl)methyl, or 2-(4-morpholinyl)ethyl group, whether or not further substituted in the indole ring to any extent and whether or not substituted in the naphthyl ring to any extent.

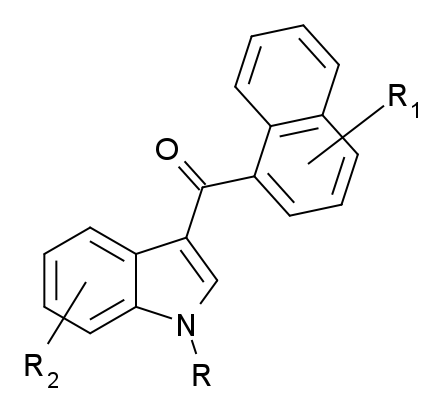
Naphthoylindoles, where R, R_{1} and R_{2} are as defined in the statute

One specific example given is JWH-018, one of the earliest synthetic cannabinoids identified. Notice the indole ring has an alkyl substitution on the nitrogen atom, but there are no additional substitutions elsewhere on the molecule.

Phenylacetylindoles: Any compound containing a 3-phenylacetylindole structure with substitution at the nitrogen atom of the indole ring by an alkyl, haloalkyl, alkenyl, cycloalkylmethyl, cycloalkylethyl,1-(N-methyl-2-piperidinyl)methyl, or 2-(4-morpholinyl)ethyl group whether or not further substituted in the indole ring to any extent and whether or not substituted in the phenyl ring to any extent.

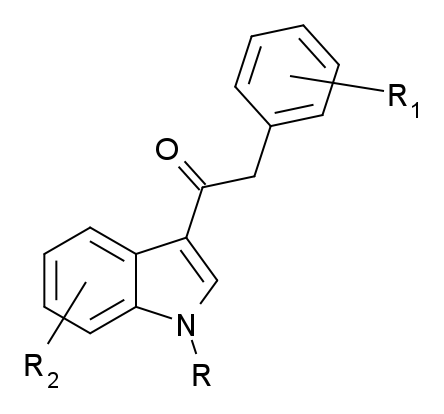
Phenylacetylindoles, where R, R_{1} and R_{2} are as defined in the statute

One example given is JWH-250. There is an alkyl substitution on the nitrogen atom of the indole ring as well as a methoxy group attached to the phenyl ring.

Benzoylindoles: Any compound containing a 3-(benzoyl)indole structure with substitution at the nitrogen atom of the indole ring by an alkyl, haloalkyl, alkenyl, cycloalkylmethyl, cycloalkylethyl, 1-(N-methyl-2-piperidinyl)methyl, or 2-(4-morpholinyl)ethyl group whether or not further substituted in the indole ring to any extent and whether or not substituted in the phenyl ring to any extent.

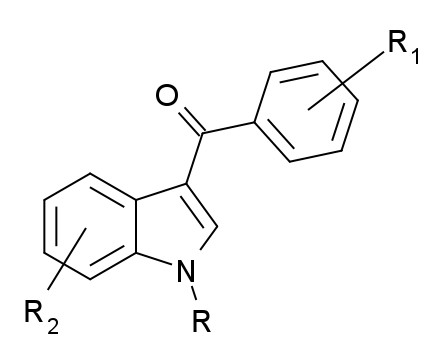
Benzoylindoles, where R, R_{1} and R_{2} are as defined in the statute

One example is RCS-4. Note the alkyl group substitution on the nitrogen atom of the indole. It is further substituted in the phenyl ring with a methoxy group.

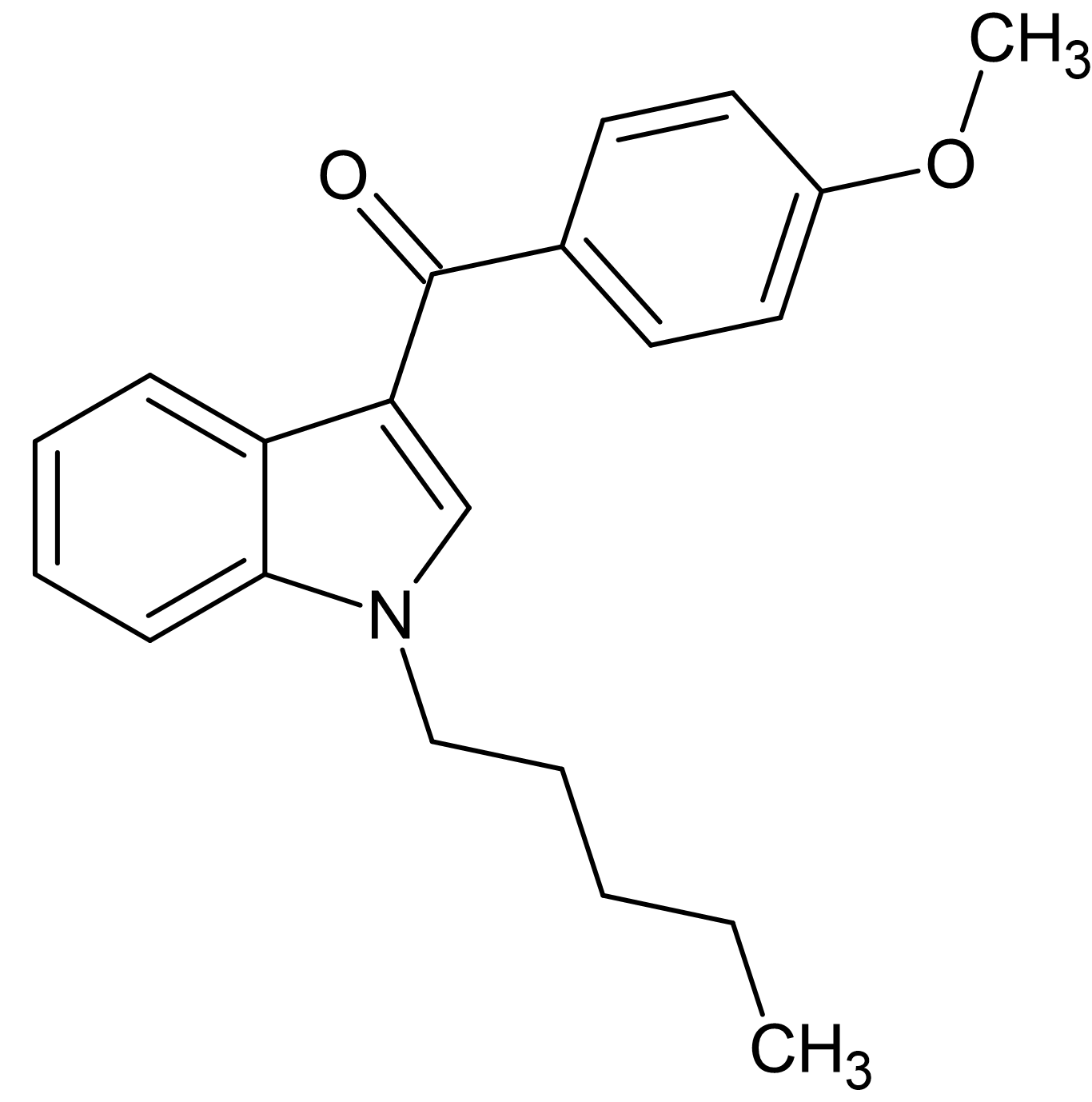

Cyclohexylphenols: Any compound containing a 2-(3-hydroxycyclohexyl)phenol structure with substitution at the 5-position of the phenolic ring by an alkyl, haloalkyl, alkenyl, cycloalkylmethyl, cycloalkylethyl, 1-(N-methyl-2-piperidinyl)methyl, or 2-(4-morpholinyl)ethyl group whether or not substituted in the cyclohexyl ring to any extent.

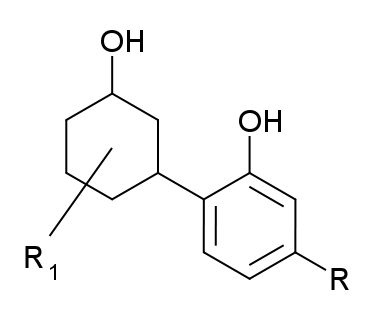
Cyclohexylphenols, where R and R_{1} are as defined in the statute

One example is CP 47,497. Notice the methyloctan-2-yl alkyl group substituted onto the 5-position of the phenol ring of the molecule. Note that this definition encompasses only those compounds that have OH groups attached to both the phenyl and the cyclohexyl rings, and so does not include compounds such as O-1871 which lacks the cyclohexyl OH group, or compounds such as JWH-337 or JWH-344 which lack the phenolic OH group. Some jurisdictions have addressed this by naming such compounds specifically, alternatively some have adopted broader definitions (such as in the Australian Federal Poisons Standard, which controls all derivatives of cyclohexylphenol unless otherwise specified).

Naphthylmethylindoles: Any compound containing a 1H-indol-3-yl-(1-naphthyl)methane structure with substitution at the nitrogen atom of the indole ring by an alkyl, haloalkyl, alkenyl, cycloalkylmethyl, cycloalkylethyl, 1-(N-methyl-2-piperidinyl)methyl, or 2-(4-morpholinyl)ethyl group whether or not further substituted in the indole ring to any extent and whether or not substituted in the naphthyl ring to any extent.

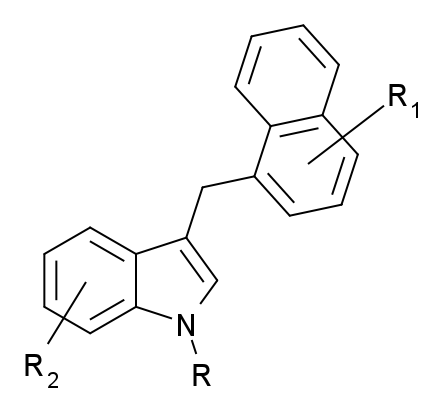
Naphthylmethylindoles, where R, R_{1} and R_{2} are as defined in the statute

One example is JWH-175. Notice the pentyl group substituted onto the nitrogen atom of the indole ring.

Naphthoylpyrroles: Any compound containing a 3-(1-naphthoyl)pyrrole structure with substitution at the nitrogen atom of the pyrrole ring by an alkyl, haloalkyl, alkenyl, cycloalkylmethyl, cycloalkylethyl, 1-(N-methyl-2-piperidinyl)methyl, or 2-(4-morpholinyl)ethyl group whether or not further substituted in the pyrrole ring to any extent and whether or not substituted in the naphthyl ring to any extent.

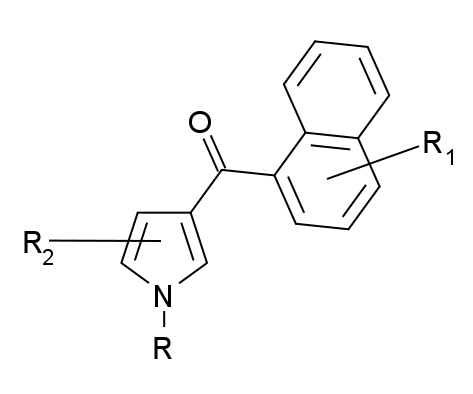
Naphthoylpyrroles, where R, R_{1} and R_{2} are as defined in the statute

One example is JWH-030. Notice the pentyl group on the nitrogen atom of the pyrrole ring of the molecule.

Naphthylmethylindenes: Any compound containing a 1-(1-naphthylmethyl)indene structure with substitution at the 3-position of the indene ring by an alkyl, haloalkyl, alkenyl, cycloalkylmethyl, cycloalkylethyl, 1-(N-methyl-2-piperidinyl)methyl, or 2-(4-morpholinyl)ethyl group whether or not further substituted in the indene ring to any extent and whether or not substituted in the naphthyl ring to any extent.

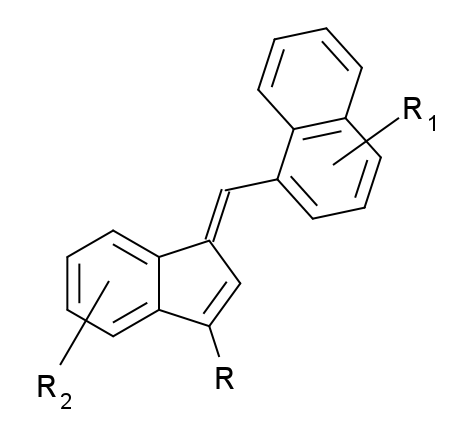
"Naphthylmethylindenes" (sic), where R, R_{1} and R_{2} are as defined in the statute

One example is JWH-176. Notice the 5 membered pentyl chain on the 3-position of the indene ring. Strictly speaking this chemical name is incorrect, as JWH-176 and related compounds would more correctly be viewed as derivatives of 1-(1-naphthylmethylylidene)indene due to the unsaturated =CH- linker group (as opposed to the -CH_{2}- linker group found in e.g. naphthylmethylindoles), however "Naphthylmethylindenes" has gained acceptance as a legal term of art in this instance.

JWH-176

Tetramethylcyclopropanoylindoles: Any compound containing a 3-(1-tetramethylcyclopropoyl)indole structure with substitution at the nitrogen atom of the indole ring by an alkyl, haloalkyl, cycloalkylmethyl, cycloalkylethyl, 1-(N-methyl-2-piperidinyl)methyl, or 2-(4-morpholinyl)ethyl group, whether or not further substituted in the indole ring to any extent and whether or not further substituted in the tetramethylcyclopropyl ring to any extent. While all known examples of compounds from this group have a 2,2,3,3-tetramethylcyclopropyl substituent, this definition would also encompass other isomers.

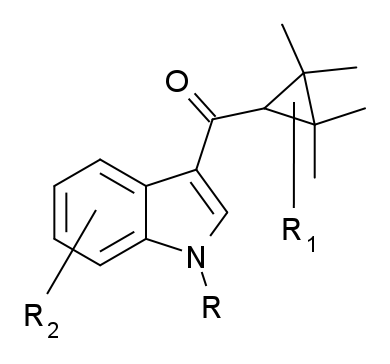
Tetramethylcyclopropanoylindoles, where R, R_{1} and R_{2} are as defined in the statute

One example is XLR-11. Notice the 5 membered alkyl group ending with a fluorine atom substituted onto the nitrogen atom of the indole group.

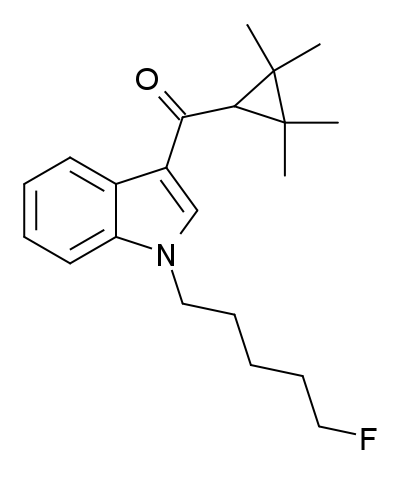

Adamantoylindoles: Any compound containing a 3-(1-adamantoyl)indole structure with substitution at the nitrogen atom of the indole ring by an alkyl, haloalkyl, alkenyl, cycloalkylmethyl, cycloalkylethyl, 1-(N-methyl-2-piperidinyl)methyl,or2-(4-morpholinyl)ethyl group, whether or not further substituted in the indole ring to any extent and whether or not substituted in the adamantyl ring system to any extent. Note that this definition (from the Kentucky statute) covers only compounds where the adamantyl group is attached by the 1-position, and would not include compounds where it is attached by the 2-position. Some other jurisdictions have consequently omitted the numbering from their corresponding definition (cf. Arizona for example), so as to cover a broader range of compounds.

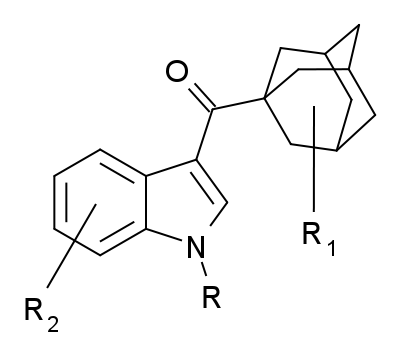
Adamantoylindoles, where R, R_{1} and R_{2} are as defined in the statute

One example is AB-001. Notice the 5-membered alkyl group on the nitrogen atom of the indole ring.

Indole-3-carboxylate esters: Any compound containing a 1H-indole-3-carboxylate ester structure with the ester oxygen bearing a napthyl, quinolinyl, isoquinolinyl, or adamantyl group and substitution at the one position of the indole ring by an alkyl, haloalkyl, alkenyl, cycloalkylmethyl, cycloalkylethyl, benzyl, N-methyl-2-piperidinylmethyl, or 2-(4-morpholinyl)ethyl group, whether or not further substituted on the indole ring to any extent and whether or not further substituted on the naphthyl, quinolinyl, isoquinolinyl, adamantyl, or benzyl groups to any extent.

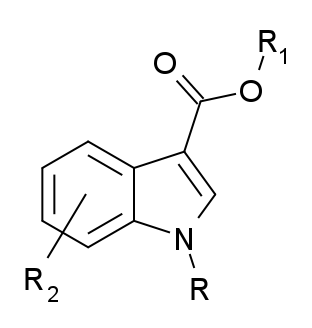
Indole-3-carboxylate esters, where R, R_{1} and R_{2} are as defined in the statute

One example is PB-22. Notice the quinolinyl group attached to the oxygen atom and the 5 carbon chain (pentyl) group on the nitrogen atom.

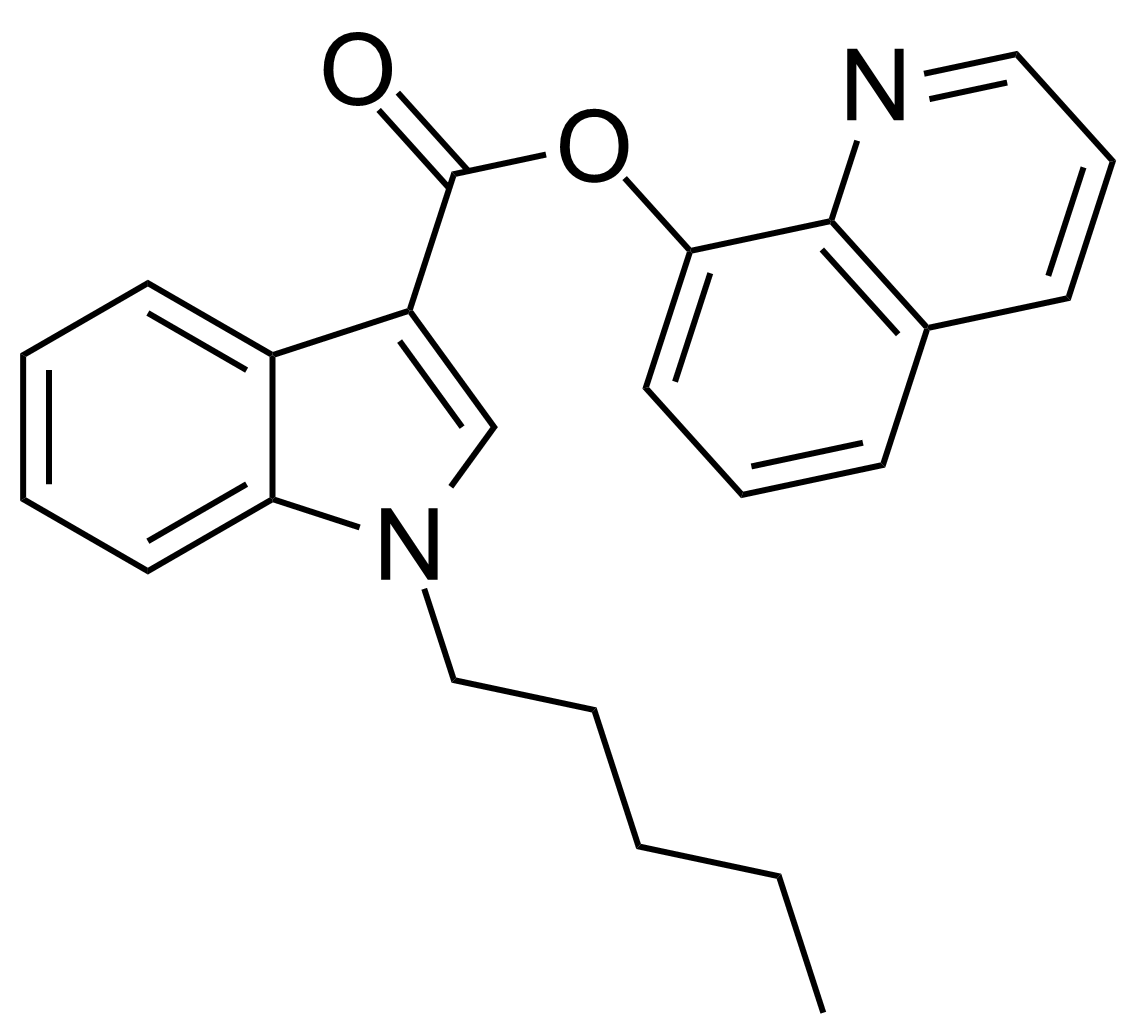

Indazole-3-carboxamides: Any compound containing a 1H-indazole-3-carboxamide structure with substitution at the nitrogen of the carboxamide by a naphthyl, quinolinyl, isoquinolinyl, adamantyl, or 1-amino-1-oxoalkan-2-yl group and substitution at the one position of the indazole ring by an alkyl, haloalkyl, alkenyl, cycloalkylmethyl, cycloalkylethyl, benzyl, N-methyl-2-piperidinylmethyl, or 2-(4-morpholinyl)ethyl group, whether or not further substituted on the indazole ring to any extent and whether or not further substituted on the naphthyl, quinolinyl, isoquinolinyl, adamantyl, 1-amino-oxoalkan-2-yl, or benzyl groups to any extent.

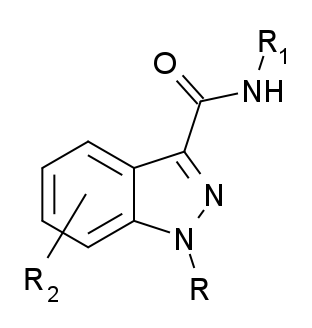
Indazole-3-carboxamides, where R, R_{1} and R_{2} are as defined in the statute

One example is AB-CHMINACA. Notice the indazole group has a cyclohexylmethyl (a type of cycloalkylmethyl) group attached at the nitrogen atom. Also there is an 1-amino-1-oxoalkan-2-yl group (1-amino-3-methyl-1-oxobutan-2-yl in this instance) substituted on the nitrogen atom of the carboxamide group.

== Other approaches to general controls ==
One consequence of the introduction of broad Markush structure bans, has been the appearance of compounds which have similar structures but technically fall outside the scope of the legal definitions (for instance containing an indazole core instead of the proscribed indole, or a carboxamide linker in place of methanone), therefore resulting over time in a progressively increasing structural diversity of synthetic cannabinoids sold for illicit recreational use.

Some jurisdictions have attempted to introduce a broader scope of coverage by defining "head", "core", "linker" and "tail" groups which can be interchanged in any combination that fits within the definition, resulting in a much wider (but still usually finite) range of compounds being encompassed.

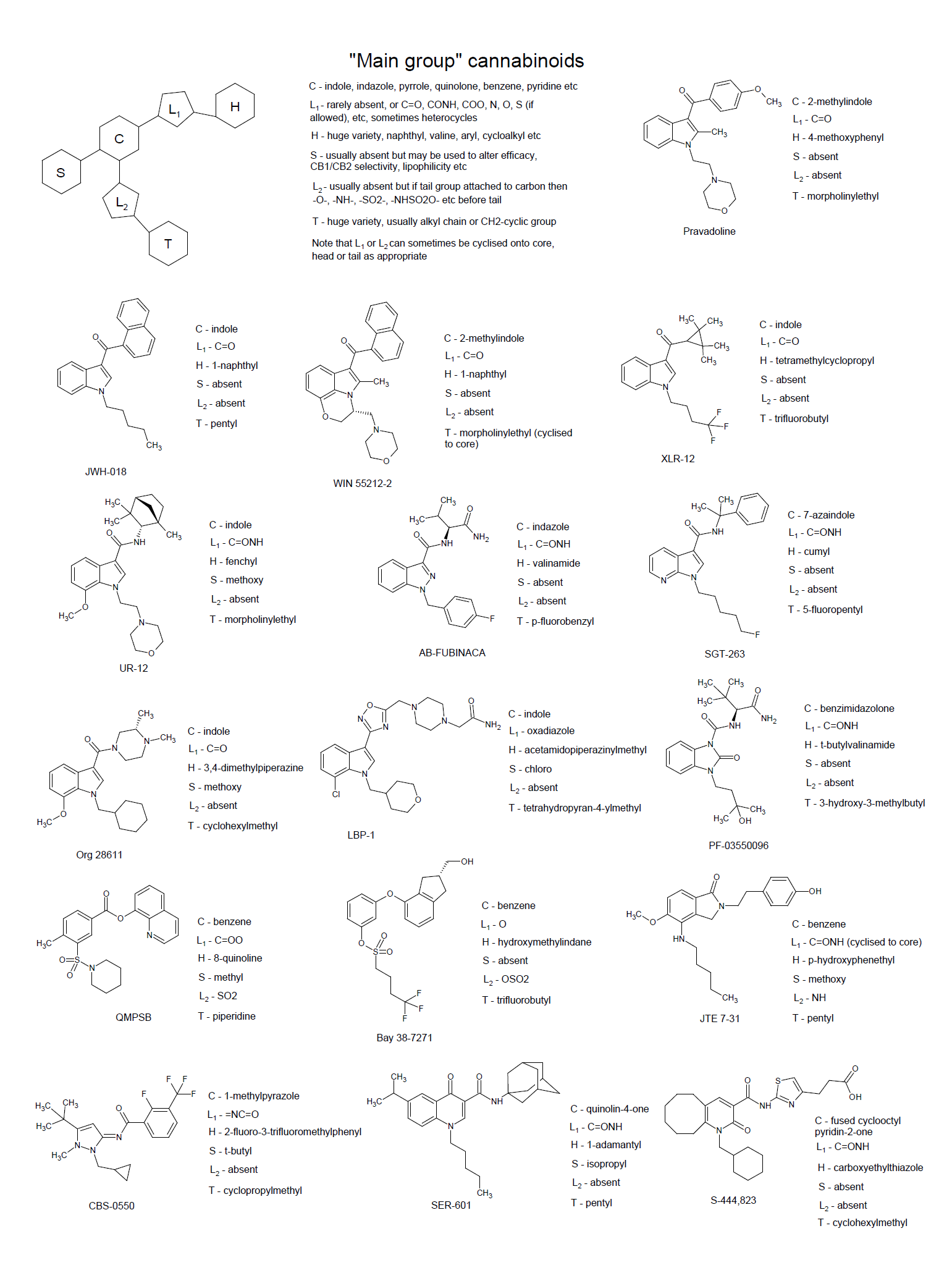
Overview of the "head-core-tail" model of main group of synthetic cannabinoids

For example, the wording of this Texas statute encompasses a large range of "prophetic" core structures which have not yet been encountered in synthetic cannabinoids, but might plausibly be likely to appear in future (e.g. "Quinolinoyl pyrazole carboxylate", "Naphthoylimidazole" etc);

"(a) In this section:

(1) “Core component” is one of the following: azaindole, benzimidazole, benzothiazole, carbazole, imidazole, indane, indazole, indene, indole, pyrazole, pyrazolopyridine, pyridine, or pyrrole.

(2) “Group A component” is one of the following: adamantane, benzene, cycloalkylmethyl, isoquinoline, methylpiperazine, naphthalene, phenyl, quinoline, tetrahydronaphthalene, tetramethylcyclopropane, amino oxobutane, amino dimethyl oxobutane, amino phenyl oxopropane, methyl methoxy oxobutane, methoxy dimethyl oxobutane, methoxy phenyl oxopropane, or an amino acid.

(3) “Link component” is one of the following functional groups: carboxamide, carboxylate, hydrazide, methanone (ketone), ethanone, methanediyl (methylene bridge), or methine...

...(5) any compound containing a core component substituted at the 1-position to any extent, and substituted at the 3-position with a link component attached to a group A component, whether or not the core component or group A component are further substituted to any extent"

Another approach (here from the UK) is to list an example structure and then specify ways in which it can be modified by swapping various parts of the molecule with alternative substituent groups, for example;

"...any compound (not being clonitazene, etonitazene, acemetacin, atorvastatin, bazedoxifene, indometacin, losartan, olmesartan, proglumetacin, telmisartan, viminol, zafirlukast or a compound for the time being specified in sub-paragraphs (h) to (s) above) structurally related to 1-pentyl-3-(1-naphthoyl)indole (JWH-018), in that the four sub-structures, that is to say the indole ring, the pentyl substituent, the methanone linking group and the naphthyl ring, are linked together in a similar manner, whether or not any of the sub-structures have been modified, and whether or not substituted in any of the linked sub-structures with one or more univalent substituents and, where any of the sub-structures have been modified, the modifications of the sub-structures are limited to any of the following, that is to say -

1. replacement of the indole ring with indane, indene, indazole, pyrrole, pyrazole, imidazole, benzimidazole, pyrrolo[2,3-b]pyridine, pyrrolo[3,2-c]pyridine or pyrazolo[3,4-b]pyridine;
2. replacement of the pentyl substituent with alkyl, alkenyl, benzyl, cycloalkylmethyl, cycloalkylethyl, (N-methylpiperidin-2-yl)methyl, 2-(4-morpholinyl)ethyl or (tetrahydropyran-4-yl)methyl;
3. replacement of the methanone linking group with an ethanone, carboxamide, carboxylate, methylene bridge or methine group;
4. replacement of the 1-naphthyl ring with 2-naphthyl, phenyl, benzyl, adamantyl, cycloalkyl, cycloalkylmethyl, cycloalkylethyl, bicyclo[2.2.1]heptanyl, 1,2,3,4-tetrahydronaphthyl, quinolinyl, isoquinolinyl, 1-amino-1-oxopropan-2-yl, 1-hydroxy-1-oxopropan-2-yl, piperidinyl, morpholinyl, pyrrolidinyl, tetrahydropyranyl or piperazinyl."

Broadly worded controls such as above may inadvertently include large numbers of compounds which merely happen to have some structural similarity, but do not have similar pharmacological effects to the prohibited cannabinoid drugs. One approach to this is to specifically list examples of such compounds that need to be exempted from the general control, so that commonly used medicines do not become subject to control as illegal drug analogs. Another issue is that even with such a wide range of structural modifications covered, modern predictive drug discovery techniques may generate novel analogues which still fall outside the specified range of prohibited structures.

== See also ==
- Comparison of phytocannabinoids
