= Azinomycin B =

Names
- IUPAC name (1S)-2-{[(1E)-1-[(3R,4R,5S)-3-Acetoxy-4-hydroxy-1-azabicyclo[3.1.0]hex-2-ylidene]-2-{[(1Z)-1-hydroxy-3-oxo-1-buten-2-yl]amino}-2-oxoethyl]amino}-1-[(2S)-2-methyl-2-oxiranyl]-2-oxoethyl 3-methoxy-5-methyl-1-naphthoate
- Other names Carzinophilin A; Carzinophillin A

Identifiers
CAS Number	106486-76-4
3D model (JSmol)	Interactive image
Beilstein Reference	9537192
ChEBI	CHEBI:50862
ChemSpider	10270414
PubChem CID	14476972
UNII	051R55X44C
- InChI: InChI=1S/C31H33N3O11/c1-14-7-6-8-18-19(14)9-17(42-5)10-20(18)30(41)45-27(31(4)13-43-31)29(40)33-23(28(39)32-21(12-35)15(2)36)24-26(44-16(3)37)25(38)22-11-34(22)24/h6-10,12,22,25-27,35,38H,11,13H2,1-5H3,(H,32,39)(H,33,40)/b21-12-,24-23+/t22-,25+,26+,27+,31-,34?/m0/s1 Key: QIKVYJOCQXXRSJ-PKDLRSQSSA-N
- SMILES: Cc1cccc2c1cc(cc2C(=O)O[C@H](C(=O)N/C(=C/3\[C@H]([C@@H]([C@H]4N3C4)O)OC(=O)C)/C(=O)N/C(=C\O)/C(=O)C)[C@@]5(CO5)C)OC

Properties
Chemical formula	C_{31}H_{33}N_{3}O_{11}
Molar mass	623.615 g·mol^{−1}
- Except where otherwise noted, data are given for materials in their standard state (at 25 °C [77 °F], 100 kPa). Infobox references

Azinomycin B is a natural product that contains densely assembled functionalities with potent antitumor activity. It is isolated from Streptomyces sahachiroi which is reisolated from S. griseofuscus along with its analog azinomycin A. Azinomycin B can bind within the major groove of DNA and forms covalent interstrand crosslinks (ISCs) with the purine bases. The DNA alkylation and crosslinking by azinomycin B suggests its potent antitumor activity.

== Biosynthesis ==
The biosynthesis of azinomycin B includes a type 1 polyketide synthase and several nonribosomal peptide synthetases.

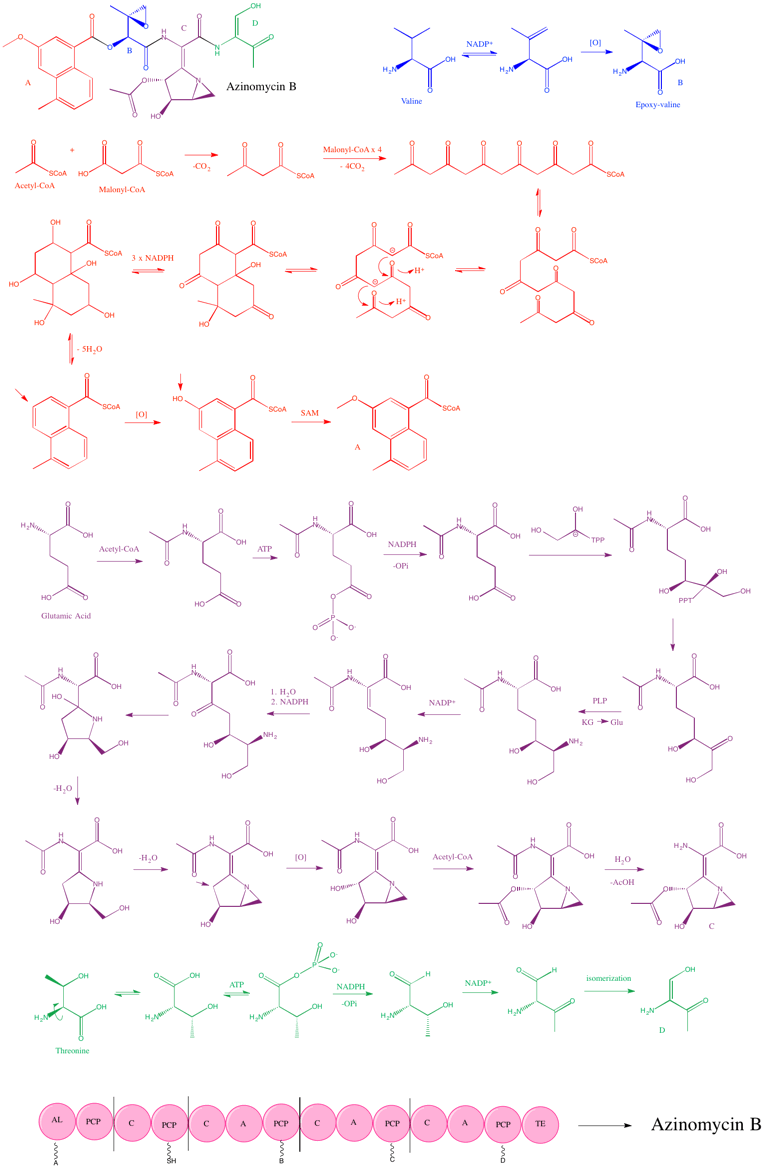
Azinomycin B biosynthesis
