= Ciclobendazole =

Chemical compound

Clinical data
- ATC code: P02CA04 (WHO)

Identifiers
- IUPAC name: Methyl N-[6-(cyclopropanecarbonyl)-1H-benzimidazol-2-yl]carbamate
- CAS Number: 31431-43-3
- PubChem CID: 35803
- ChemSpider: 32933
- UNII: JF3KQ40J31
- KEGG: D03623
- CompTox Dashboard (EPA): DTXSID9057713
- ECHA InfoCard: 100.046.018

Chemical and physical data
- Formula: C_{13}H_{13}N_{3}O_{3}
- Molar mass: 259.265 g·mol^{−1}
- 3D model (JSmol): Interactive image
- SMILES: COC(=O)Nc3nc2ccc(C(=O)C1CC1)cc2[nH]3
- InChI: InChI=1S/C13H13N3O3/c1-19-13(18)16-12-14-9-5-4-8(6-10(9)15-12)11(17)7-2-3-7/h4-7H,2-3H2,1H3,(H2,14,15,16,18); Key:OXLKOMYHDYVIDM-UHFFFAOYSA-N

Ciclobendazole is an anthelmintic, that is a pharmaceutical drug against parasitic worms. It underwent a clinical trial in the 1970s, where it was found to be as effective as mebendazole in the treatment of hookworm infection and ascariasis, but significantly less effective in the treatment of trichuriasis.

It is not known to be marketed anywhere in the world.
