= Hycanthone =

Chemical compound

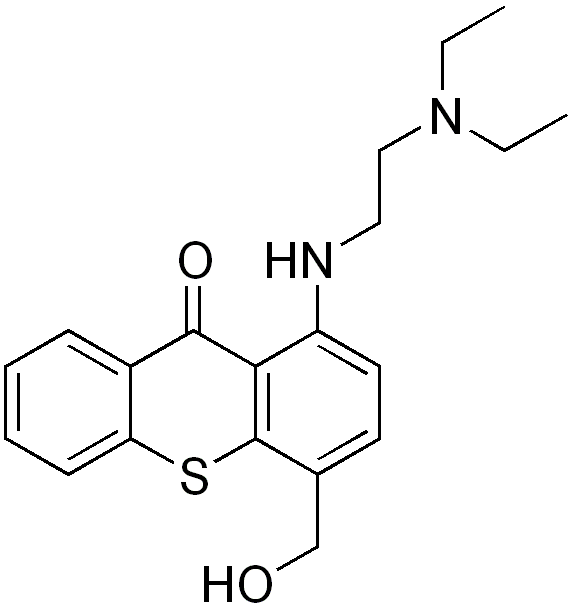

Clinical data
- ATC code: none

Identifiers
- IUPAC name: 1-(2-Diethylaminoethylamino)-4-(hydroxymethyl)-9-thioxanthenone
- CAS Number: 3105-97-3
- PubChem CID: 3634
- ChemSpider: 3508
- UNII: 2BXX5EVN2A
- KEGG: D00541
- ChEBI: CHEBI:52768
- ChEMBL: ChEMBL22077
- CompTox Dashboard (EPA): DTXSID9023128
- ECHA InfoCard: 100.019.512

Chemical and physical data
- Formula: C_{20}H_{24}N_{2}O_{2}S
- Molar mass: 356.48 g·mol^{−1}
- 3D model (JSmol): Interactive image
- SMILES: CCN(CC)CCNC1=C2C(=C(C=C1)CO)SC3=CC=CC=C3C2=O
- InChI: InChI=1S/C20H24N2O2S/c1-3-22(4-2)12-11-21-16-10-9-14(13-23)20-18(16)19(24)15-7-5-6-8-17(15)25-20/h5-10,21,23H,3-4,11-13H2,1-2H3; Key:MFZWMTSUNYWVBU-UHFFFAOYSA-N

Hycanthone is the schistosomicide approved by the FDA in 1975. It is a metabolite of lucanthone. Hycanthone interferes with parasite nerve function, resulting in paralysis and death. This agent also intercalates into DNA and inhibits RNA synthesis in vitro and shows potential antineoplastic activity.

== Anti-schistosomal activity ==
Hycanthone is shown to be an effective inhibitor of acetylcholinesterase (AChE) from Schistosoma mansoni, but is less potential against AChE from mammalian origin. This might come from differences in the configuration of active center between schistosome and mammalian AChE enzymes.

Hycanthone is shown to intercalate into DNA and inhibit RNA synthesis in vitro. A growing body of evidence has shown that hycathone has an antineoplastic activity.

== Toxicity ==
Hycanthone is a dose-dependent hepatotoxin, causing hepatocellular injury.

== Clinical trials ==
- Phase II Study of Chemotherapy with Hycanthone for Advanced Colorectal Carcinoma.
- Phase II Chemotherapy with Hycanthone Mesylate and Flagyl for Advanced Malignant Lymphomas (Completed)

== Physical properties ==
Physical state	Solid
Solubility	Soluble in ethanol, methanol, DMSO, and water
Absorption maximum	233, 258, 329, 438 nm
Melting point	173-176 °C
logP	3.74
