= JWH-176 =

Chemical compound

Legal status
- Legal status: UK: Class B; US: Schedule I

Identifiers
- IUPAC name: 1-([(1E)-3-Pentylinden-1-ylidine]methyl)naphthalene
- CAS Number: 619294-62-1
- ChemSpider: 29341653
- UNII: VA60GT97BB
- CompTox Dashboard (EPA): DTXSID70692895

Chemical and physical data
- Formula: C_{25}H_{24}
- Molar mass: 324.467 g·mol^{−1}
- 3D model (JSmol): Interactive image
- SMILES: CCCCCC1=C\C(=C/c2cccc3ccccc32)c2ccccc21
- InChI: InChI=1S/C25H24/c1-2-3-4-11-21-18-22(25-16-8-7-15-24(21)25)17-20-13-9-12-19-10-5-6-14-23(19)20/h5-10,12-18H,2-4,11H2,1H3/b22-17+; Key:FPESBQVTVSBBSE-OQKWZONESA-N

JWH-176 is an analgesic drug which acts as a cannabinoid receptor agonist. Its binding affinity at the CB_{1} receptor is 26.0 nM, making it more potent than THC itself, however JWH-176 is particularly notable in that it is a hydrocarbon containing no heteroatoms. This demonstrates that reasonably high-affinity cannabinoid binding and agonist effects can be produced by compounds with no hydrogen bonding capacity at all, relying merely on Van der Waals and possibly hydrophobic interactions to bind to the receptor. It was discovered by, and named after, John W. Huffman.

== Stereochemistry ==
JWH-176 is the (E)-stereoisomer of 1-([3-pentylinden-1-ylidine]methyl)naphthalene, whereas JWH-171 is the mixture of the (E)- and (Z)-isomers.

JWH-171

== Legal status ==
In the United States, CB_{1} receptor agonists of the 1-(1-naphthylmethylene)indene class such as JWH-176 and JWH-171 are Schedule I Controlled Substances.

As of 23 December 2009, any compound structurally derived from 1–(1–naphthylmethyl)indene by substitution at the 3–position of the indene ring by an alkyl group is a Class B drug in the United Kingdom.

== See also ==
- JWH-175
