= JWH-175 =

Chemical compound

Legal status
- Legal status: AU: Illegal; UK: Illegal; US: Schedule I; Illegal in Russia

Identifiers
- IUPAC name: (1-Pentylindol-3-yl)naphthalen-1-ylmethane
- CAS Number: 619294-35-8
- PubChem CID: 56603534
- ChemSpider: 29341789
- UNII: 3S82KAS832
- CompTox Dashboard (EPA): DTXSID90717796

Chemical and physical data
- Formula: C_{24}H_{25}N
- Molar mass: 327.471 g·mol^{−1}
- 3D model (JSmol): Interactive image
- SMILES: c3cccc2c3cccc2Cc(cn4CCCCC)c1ccccc14
- InChI: InChI=1S/C24H25N/c1-2-3-8-16-25-18-21(23-14-6-7-15-24(23)25)17-20-12-9-11-19-10-4-5-13-22(19)20/h4-7,9-15,18H,2-3,8,16-17H2,1H3; Key:TYBRSILIYTUTSQ-UHFFFAOYSA-N

JWH-175 is a drug from the naphthylmethylindole family which acts as a cannabinoid receptor agonist. It was invented by the scientist John W. Huffman and colleagues at Clemson University. JWH-175 is closely related to the widely used cannabinoid designer drug JWH-018, but with the ketone bridge replaced by a simpler methylene bridge. It is several times weaker than JWH-018, having a binding affinity at the CB_{1} receptor of 22 nM, though some derivatives substituted at the 4-position of the naphthyl ring have potency more closely approaching that of the equivalent naphthoylindoles. This makes JWH-175 considerably less potent than most synthetic cannabinoid drugs used in synthetic cannabis blends, and it is unclear if JWH-175 has ever been used for this purpose. However it has still been explicitly banned in several jurisdictions including Russia and some Australian states, in order to stop its potential use as an ingredient in such products. In the United States, all CB_{1} receptor agonists of the 3-(1-naphthylmethane)indole class such as JWH-175 are Schedule I Controlled Substances.

== See also ==
- JWH-176
- JWH-184
- JWH-185
