= JWH-250 =

Chemical compound

Legal status
- Legal status: AU: S9 (Prohibited substance); BR: Class F2 (Prohibited psychotropics); CA: Schedule II; DE: Anlage II; UK: Class B; US: Schedule I; Illegal in Czech Republic and Latvia

Identifiers
- IUPAC name: 2-(2-Methoxyphenyl)-1-(1-pentylindol-3-yl)ethanone
- CAS Number: 864445-43-2
- PubChem CID: 44397540
- ChemSpider: 23256117
- UNII: IP9911R8A0
- ChEMBL: ChEMBL188031
- CompTox Dashboard (EPA): DTXSID40235556

Chemical and physical data
- Formula: C_{22}H_{25}NO_{2}
- Molar mass: 335.447 g·mol^{−1}
- 3D model (JSmol): Interactive image
- SMILES: COc2ccccc2CC(=O)c(c3ccccc13)cn1CCCCC
- InChI: InChI=1S/C22H25NO2/c1-3-4-9-14-23-16-19(18-11-6-7-12-20(18)23)21(24)15-17-10-5-8-13-22(17)25-2/h5-8,10-13,16H,3-4,9,14-15H2,1-2H3; Key:FFLSJIQJQKDDCM-UHFFFAOYSA-N

JWH-250 or (1-pentyl-3-(2-methoxyphenylacetyl)indole) is an analgesic chemical from the phenylacetylindole family that acts as a cannabinoid agonist at both the CB_{1} and CB_{2} receptors, with a K_{i} of 11 nM at CB_{1} and 33 nM at CB_{2}. Unlike many of the older JWH series compounds, this compound does not have a naphthalene ring, instead occupying this position with a 2'-methoxy-phenylacetyl group, making JWH-250 a representative member of a new class of cannabinoid ligands. Other 2'-substituted analogues such as the methyl, chloro and bromo compounds are also active and somewhat more potent.

== History ==
JWH-250 was discovered by, and named after the researcher John W. Huffman. He created JWH-250 and a number of other compounds to research the structure and function of the endocannabinoid system of mammals. Samples of JWH-250 were first identified in May 2009 by the German Federal Criminal Police, as an ingredient in new generation "herbal smoking blends" that had been released since the banning of the original ingredients (C8)-CP 47,497 and JWH-018. An ELISA immunoassay technique for detecting JWH-250 in urine has been reported.

== Legal status ==
=== Australia ===
JWH-250 is considered a Schedule 9 prohibited substance in Australia under the Poisons Standard (October 2015). A Schedule 9 substance is a substance which may be abused or misused, the manufacture, possession, sale or use of which should be prohibited by law except when required for medical or scientific research, or for analytical, teaching or training purposes with approval of Commonwealth and/or State or Territory Health Authorities.

=== United States ===
In the United States, CB_{1} receptor agonists of the 3-phenylacetylindole class such as JWH-250 are Schedule I Controlled Substances.

== See also ==
- AM-2201
- JWH-073
- JWH-200
- List of JWH cannabinoids
- List of AM cannabinoids
- MEPIRAPIM
- SDB-001
- THJ-2201
