= Lucanthone =

Chemical compound

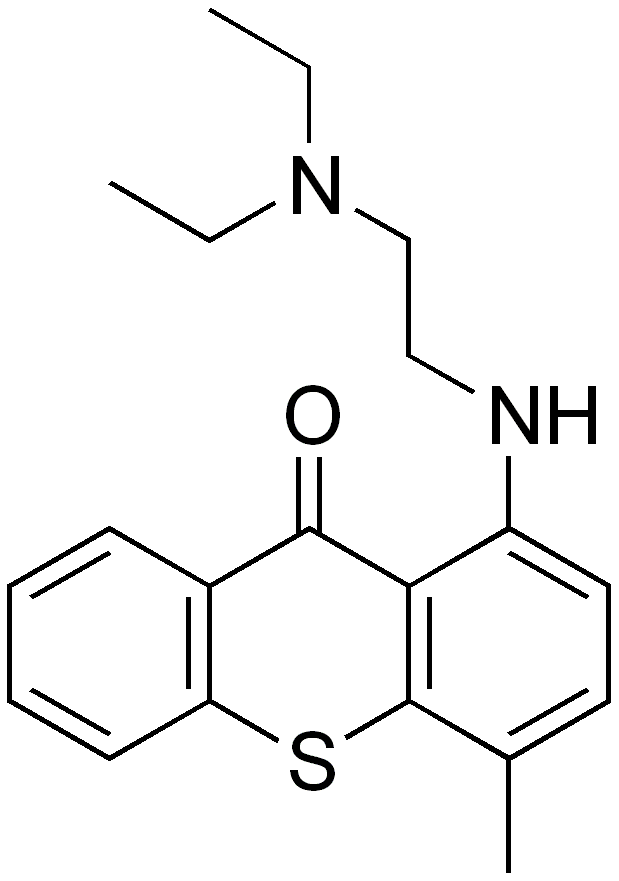

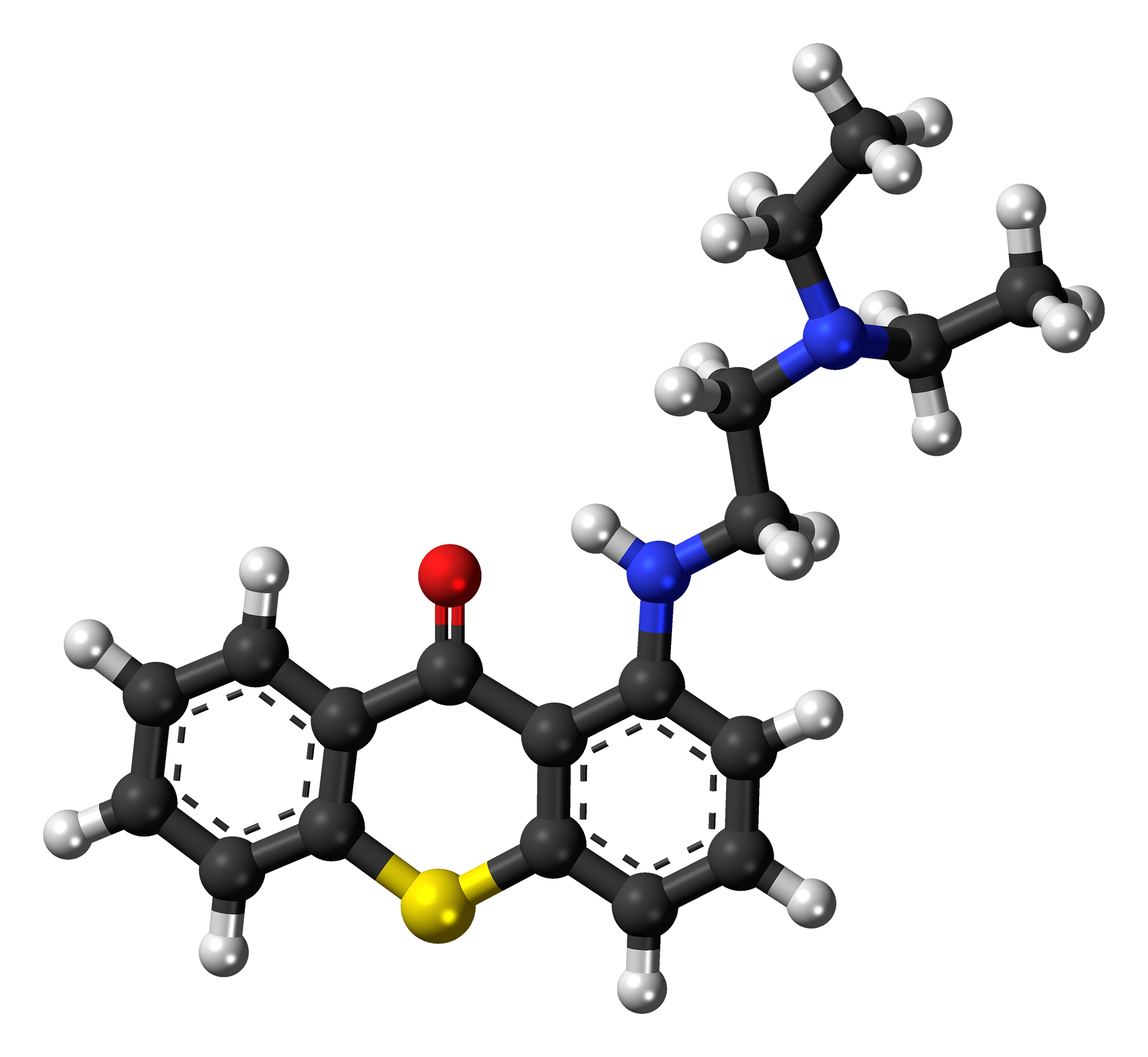

Clinical data
- ATC code: none

Identifiers
- IUPAC name: 1-{[2-(diethylamino)ethyl]amino}-4-methyl-9H-thioxanthen-9-one
- CAS Number: 479-50-5
- PubChem CID: 10180
- DrugBank: DB04967
- ChemSpider: 9772
- UNII: FC6D57000M
- ChEBI: CHEBI:51052
- CompTox Dashboard (EPA): DTXSID6023230
- ECHA InfoCard: 100.006.849

Chemical and physical data
- Formula: C_{20}H_{24}N_{2}OS
- Molar mass: 340.49 g·mol^{−1}

Lucanthone (Miracil D, Myracyl D) is a drug used to treat parasitic diseases such as schistosomiasis, which was invented in 1938 by Hans Mauss and colleagues at Bayer AG. It is a prodrug and is converted to the active metabolite hycanthone. It is no longer commonly used in humans due to hepatotoxicity, especially after the subsequent development of safer drugs with similar efficacy such as praziquantel.

== Mechanism of action ==
Hycanthone binds to acetylcholine receptors in the worm and results in increased sensitivity to stimulation by 5-HT causing increase in motility, paired worms are separated and reproduction is stopped. It causes damage of the integument and vitelline duct.

== Research ==
Lucanthone also shows anti-cancer activity, and while it has never been approved for medical use as a chemotherapy drug due to its toxicity, it has been tested in human clinical trials as an adjuvant therapy to increase the effectiveness of other chemotherapy medications, and continues to be used in cancer research.

== Synthesis ==
The original synthesis route by Mauss and colleagues produces a mixture of isomers which then needs to be separated, this was subsequently improved upon in the 1950s.

Lucanthone synthesis

Lucanthone improved precursor
