= Naphthoyl =

Naphthoyl (naphthalenecarbonyl) is an acyl group derived from naphthoic acid.

It may refer to:

- 1-naphthoyl (naphthalene-1-carbonyl), derived from 1-naphthoic acid
- 2-naphthoyl (naphthalene-2-carbonyl), derived from 2-naphthoic acid

== See also ==
- Naphthalene
- Carbonyl
