= 2-Hydroxy-1-naphthoic acid =

Names
- Preferred IUPAC name 2-Hydroxynaphthalene-1-carboxylic acid

Identifiers
CAS Number	2283-08-1
3D model (JSmol)	Interactive image
ChEMBL	ChEMBL2269234
ChemSpider	15915
ECHA InfoCard	100.017.200
EC Number	218-919-2
PubChem CID	16790
UNII	E3H4QZ94UY
CompTox Dashboard (EPA)	DTXSID9062304
- InChI: InChI=1S/C11H8O3/c12-9-6-5-7-3-1-2-4-8(7)10(9)11(13)14/h1-6,12H,(H,13,14) Key: UPHOPMSGKZNELG-UHFFFAOYSA-N
- SMILES: C1=CC=C2C(=C1)C=CC(=C2C(=O)O)O

Properties
Chemical formula	C_{11}H_{8}O_{3}
Molar mass	188.182 g·mol^{−1}
Melting point	156–157 °C (313–315 °F; 429–430 K) decarboxylates to give 2-naphthol

Hazards
- GHS labelling
Pictograms	(GHS07: Exclamation mark)
Signal word	Warning
Hazard statements	H315, H319, H335
Precautionary statements	P261, P264, P264+P265, P271, P280, P302+P352, P304+P340, P305+P351+P338, P319, P321, P332+P317, P337+P317, P362+P364, P403+P233, P405, P501
- Except where otherwise noted, data are given for materials in their standard state (at 25 °C [77 °F], 100 kPa). Infobox references

2-Hydroxy-1-naphthoic acid is an organic compound with the formula C_{10}H_{6}(OH)(CO_{2}H). It is prepared by carboxylation of 2-naphthol by the Kolbe–Schmitt reaction. It is one of several hydroxynaphthoic acids.
