= 3-Hydroxy-2-naphthoic acid =

Names
- Preferred IUPAC name 3-Hydroxynaphthalene-2-carboxylic acid
- Other names 3-Hydroxy-2-naphthoic acid BON acid β-Hydroxynaphthoic acid

Identifiers
CAS Number	92-70-6
3D model (JSmol)	Interactive image
Beilstein Reference	744100
ChEBI	CHEBI:80383
ChEMBL	ChEMBLCHEMBL229301
ChemSpider	6837
ECHA InfoCard	100.001.983
EC Number	202-180-8
KEGG	C16212
PubChem CID	7104
RTECS number	QL1755000
UNII	C7S9D784HX
CompTox Dashboard (EPA)	DTXSID3026560
- InChI: InChI=1S/C11H8O3/c12-10-6-8-4-2-1-3-7(8)5-9(10)11(13)14/h1-6,12H,(H,13,14) Key: ALKYHXVLJMQRLQ-UHFFFAOYSA-N
- SMILES: C1=CC=C2C=C(C(=CC2=C1)C(=O)O)O

Properties
Chemical formula	C_{11}H_{8}O_{3}
Molar mass	188.182 g·mol^{−1}
Appearance	Yellow solid
Melting point	222 °C (432 °F; 495 K)

Hazards
- GHS labelling
Pictograms	(GHS07: Exclamation mark) (GHS08: Health hazard)
Signal word	Warning
Hazard statements	H302, H312, H317, H319, H361, H371, H412
Precautionary statements	P201, P202, P260, P264, P270, P272, P273, P280, P281, P301+P312, P302+P352, P305+P351+P338, P308+P313, P309+P311, P312, P321, P322, P330, P333+P313, P337+P313, P363, P405, P501
- Except where otherwise noted, data are given for materials in their standard state (at 25 °C [77 °F], 100 kPa). Infobox references

3-Hydroxy-2-naphthoic acid is an organic compound with the formula C_{10}H_{6}(OH)(CO_{2}H). It is one of the several hydroxynaphthoic acids. It is a precursor to some azo dyes and pigments. It is prepared by carboxylation of 2-naphthol by the Kolbe–Schmitt reaction.

== Reactions ==
Lithol Rubine BK is one of many dyes made from 3-hydroxy-2-naphthoic acid. Notice that the coupling occurs adjacent to the hydroxy group.

3-Hydroxy-2-naphthoic acid is a precursor to many anilides, such as Naphthol AS, which are reactive toward diazonium salts to give deeply colored azo compounds. Azo coupling of 3-hydroxy-2-naphthoic acid gives many dyes as well. Heating 3-hydroxy-2-naphthoic acid in ammonia give 3-amino-2-naphthoic acid.

3-Hydroxy-2-naphthoic acid can be condensed with 4-amino-2-benzimidazolinone. The resulting amide is a precursor to commercial dyes and pigments via azo coupling.

3-Hydroxy-2-naphthoic acid can be used to make Dynasore [304448-55-3].

== Related compounds ==
- 2-Hydroxy-1-naphthoic acid
