= Pentamycin =

Chemical compound

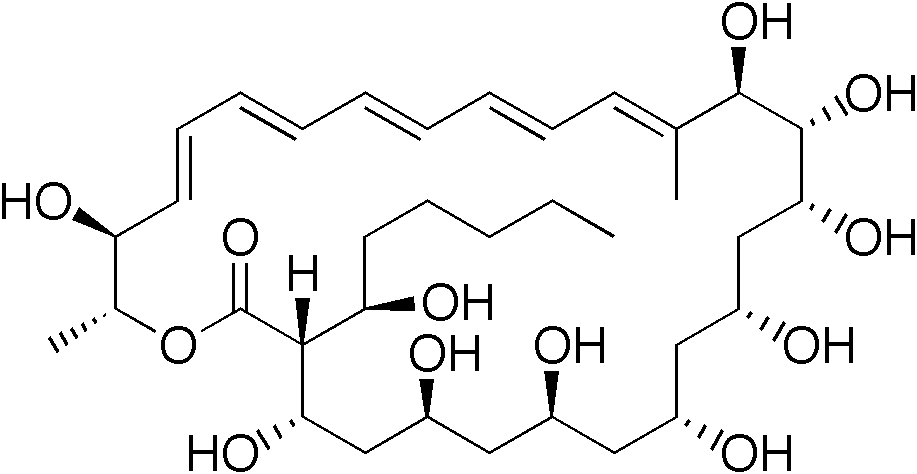

Clinical data
- Routes of administration: Vaginal pessary
- ATC code: G01AA11 (WHO)

Identifiers
- IUPAC name: (3R,4S,6S,8S,10R,12R,14R,15R,16R,17E,19E,21E,23E,25E,27S,28R)-4,6,8,10,12,14,15,16,27-nonahydroxy-3-[(1R)-1-hydroxyhexyl]-17,28-dimethyl-1-oxacyclooctacosa-17,19,21,23,25-pentaen-2-one
- CAS Number: 6834-98-6
- PubChem CID: 5358751
- ChemSpider: 4445390
- UNII: 1JB340D58S
- ChEMBL: ChEMBL2272031
- CompTox Dashboard (EPA): DTXSID4046866
- ECHA InfoCard: 100.027.194

Chemical and physical data
- Formula: C_{35}H_{58}O_{12}
- Molar mass: 670.837 g·mol^{−1}
- InChI: InChI=1S/C35H58O12/c1-4-5-11-16-29(41)32-30(42)20-26(38)18-24(36)17-25(37)19-27(39)21-31(43)34(45)33(44)22(2)14-12-9-7-6-8-10-13-15-28(40)23(3)47-35(32)46/h6-10,12-15,23-34,36-45H,4-5,11,16-21H2,1-3H3/b7-6+,10-8+,12-9+,15-13+,22-14+/t23-,24+,25-,26+,27-,28+,29-,30+,31-,32-,33-,34-/m1/s1; Key:AGJUUQSLGVCRQA-SWOUQTJZSA-N

Pentamycin, also called fungichromin, is a macrolide antimicrobial. Pentamycin is a polyene antifungal antibiotic obtained from Streptomyces pentaticus. It is used in the treatment of vaginal candidiasis, for the protozoal infection trichomoniasis, and mixed infections. A 3 mg vaginal pessary is inserted once or twice daily for 5-10 days. It is also used to treat pulmonary aspergillosis as a dry powder inhalation system.
