= Hydroxynaphthoic acid =

Hydroxynaphthoic acid may refer to any of several isomers.

Hydroxynaphthoic Acids
Compound	Registry number (RN)	melting point (°C)
2-Hydroxy-1-naphthoic acid	2283-08-1	156–157
3-Hydroxy-1-naphthoic acid	19700-42-6	248 – 249
4-Hydroxy-1-naphthoic acid	7474-97-7	188 – 189
5-Hydroxy-1-naphthoic acid	2437-16-3	236
6-Hydroxy-1-naphthoic acid	2437-17-4	213
7-Hydroxy-1-naphthoic acid	2623-37-2	256
8-Hydroxy-1-naphthoic acid	1769-88-6	169
1-Hydroxy-2-naphthoic acid	86-48-6	200
3-Hydroxy-2-naphthoic acid	92-70-6	222
4-Hydroxy-2-naphthoic acid	1573-91-7	225 – 226
5-Hydroxy-2-naphthoic acid	2437-18-5	215 – 216
6-Hydroxy-2-naphthoic acid	16712-64-4	245 – 248
7-Hydroxy-2-naphthoic acid	613-17-2	274
8-Hydroxy-2-naphthoic acid	5776-28-3	229
