= 2-Naphthoic acid =

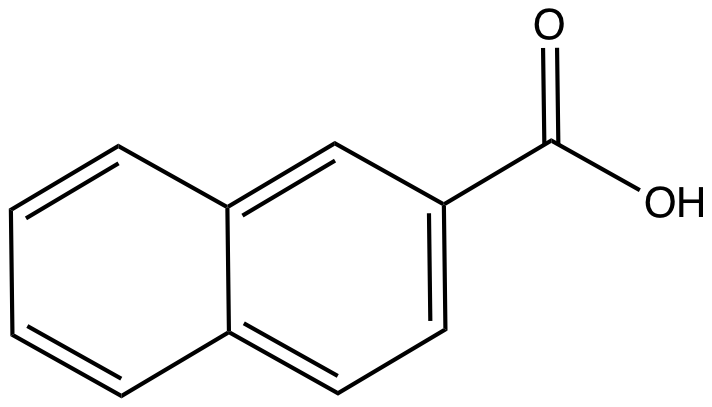

Names
- Preferred IUPAC name Naphthalene-2-carboxylic acid
- Other names 2-Naphthalenecarboxylic acid

Identifiers
CAS Number	93-09-4
3D model (JSmol)	Interactive image
Beilstein Reference	972039
ChEBI	CHEBI:36106
ChEMBL	ChEMBL114648
ChemSpider	6856
ECHA InfoCard	100.002.017
EC Number	202-217-8
Gmelin Reference	185326
KEGG	C14101
PubChem CID	7123
UNII	QLG01V0W2L
CompTox Dashboard (EPA)	DTXSID1059078
- InChI: InChI=1S/C11H8O2/c12-11(13)10-6-5-8-3-1-2-4-9(8)7-10/h1-7H,(H,12,13) Key: UOBYKYZJUGYBDK-UHFFFAOYSA-N
- SMILES: C1=CC=C2C=C(C=CC2=C1)C(=O)O

Properties
Chemical formula	C_{11}H_{8}O_{2}
Molar mass	172.183 g·mol^{−1}
Appearance	white solid
Melting point	185.5 °C (365.9 °F; 458.6 K)

Hazards
- GHS labelling
Pictograms	(GHS07: Exclamation mark)
Signal word	Warning
Hazard statements	H315, H319, H335
Precautionary statements	P261, P264, P271, P280, P302+P352, P304+P340, P305+P351+P338, P312, P321, P332+P313, P337+P313, P362, P403+P233, P405, P501
- Except where otherwise noted, data are given for materials in their standard state (at 25 °C [77 °F], 100 kPa). Infobox references

2-Naphthoic acid is an organic compound of the formula C_{10}H_{7}CO_{2}H. It is one of two isomeric carboxylic acid derivatives of naphthalene, the other one being 1-naphthoic acid. It can be prepared by carboxylation of 1-chloronaphthalene. Its pK_{a} is 4.2. The name of carboxylate anion, the conjugate base of the acid, is 2-naphthoate; the name of the related acyl group is 2-naphthoyl.

== See also ==
- Hydroxynaphthoic acids
