= Phenylacetylindole =

Class of cannabinoid designer drugs

Chemical structure of JWH-167, a simple phenylacetylindole

Phenylacetylindoles are a class of synthetic cannabinoids.

In the United States, all CB_{1} receptor agonists of the 3-phenylacetylindole class are Schedule I Controlled Substances.

== See also ==
- Structural scheduling of synthetic cannabinoids
