= Aminoalkylindole =

Aminoalkylindoles (AAIs) are a family of cannabinergic compound that act as a cannabinoid receptor agonist. They were synthesized by the pharmaceutical company Sterling-Winthrop in the early 1990s with a commercial potential as a new family of nonsteroidal anti-inflammatory agents.

Aminoalkylindole is a class of synthetic cannabinoid compounds originally developed for cannabinoid receptor pharmacology studies but later emerged as drugs of abuse. They are often found in designer drugs known as synthetic cannabinoids (SCs) or "synthetic marijuana," and their use has been associated with various adverse health effects, including acute kidney injury (AKI) as shown in a 2012 study.

== Legality ==
Aminoalkylindoles are now commonly found in synthetic cannabis designer drugs.

In the United States, the DEA added the aminoalkylindoles JWH-200 to Schedule I of the Controlled Substances Act on 1 March 2011 for 12 months until 2012.
