= Trichuriasis =

Infection by Trichuris trichiura (whipworm)

- Other names: Whipworm infection
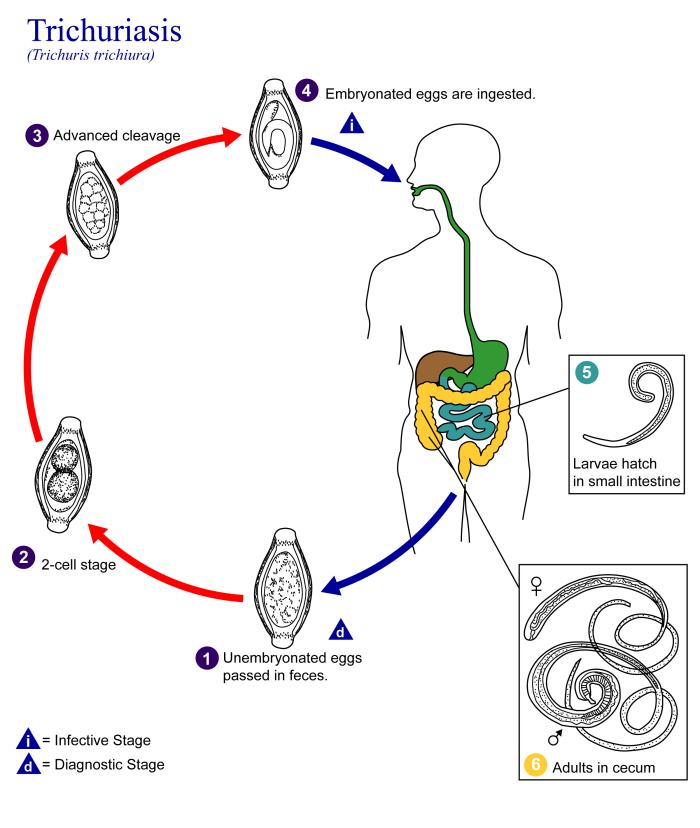
- Life cycle of Trichuris trichiura
- Specialty: Infectious disease
- Symptoms: Abdominal pain, tiredness, diarrhea
- Complications: Anemia, poor intellectual and physical development
- Causes: Eating food containing Trichuris trichiura eggs
- Diagnostic method: Stool microscopy
- Prevention: Improved sanitation, handwashing, mass treatment
- Medication: Albendazole, mebendazole, ivermectin
- Frequency: 464 million (2015)

Trichuriasis, also known as whipworm infection or trichocephaliasis, is an infection by the parasitic worm Trichuris trichiura (whipworm). If the infection is only with a few worms, there are often no symptoms. In those who are infected with many worms, there may be abdominal pain, fatigue and diarrhea. The diarrhea sometimes contains blood. Infections in children may cause poor intellectual and physical development. Low red blood cell levels may occur due to loss of blood.

The disease usually spreads when people eat food or drink water containing eggs of these worms. This may occur when contaminated vegetables are washed with contaminated water, or not fully cooked. Often these eggs are in the soil in areas where people defecate outside and where untreated human feces is used as fertilizer. These eggs originate from the feces of infected people. Young children playing in such soil and putting their hands in their mouths also become infected easily. The worms live in the large bowel and are about four centimetres in length. Whipworm is diagnosed by seeing the eggs when examining the stool with a microscope. Eggs are barrel-shaped. Trichuriasis belongs to the group of soil-transmitted helminthiases.

Prevention is by properly cooking food and hand washing before cooking. Other measures include improving access to sanitation such as ensuring use of functional and clean toilets and access to clean water. In areas of the world where the infections are common, often entire groups of people will be treated all at once and on a regular basis. Treatment is with three days of the medication: albendazole, mebendazole or ivermectin. People often become infected again after treatment.

Whipworm infection affected about 464 million and 1 billion people in 2015. It is most common in tropical countries and subtropical countries, particularly in parts of Sub-Saharan Africa, Asia and South America where the environmental conditions favor transmission. Those infected with whipworm often also have hookworm and ascariasis infections. These diseases have a large effect on the public health and economy of many countries, especially low and middle income countries. Transmission is strongly associated with poor sanitation and hygiene as infection occurs through ingestion of parasite from soil contaminated with human feces. For this reason, children are disproportionately affected and carry the heaviest burden of the disease from playing outdoors. Work is ongoing to develop a vaccine against the disease. Trichuriasis is classified as a neglected tropical disease.

== Signs and symptoms ==
Light infestations (<100 worms) frequently have no symptoms. Heavier infestations, especially in small children, can present gastrointestinal problems including abdominal pain and distension, bloody or mucus-filled diarrhea, and tenesmus (feeling of incomplete defecation, generally accompanied by involuntary straining). Mechanical damage to the intestinal mucosa, and toxic, or inflammatory damage to the host's intestines may occur. While appendicitis may be brought on by damage and edema of the adjacent tissue, if there are large numbers of worms or larvae present, it has been suggested that the embedding of the worms into the ileocecal region may also make the host susceptible to bacterial infection. A severe infection with high numbers of embedded worms in the rectum leads to edema, which can cause rectal prolapse, although this is typically only seen in small children. The prolapsed, inflamed, and edematous rectal tissue may even show visible worms.

Physical growth delay, weight loss, nutritional deficiencies, and anemia (due to long-standing blood loss) are also characteristic of infection, and these symptoms are more prevalent and severe in children. It can cause eosinophilia but it is not common.

Coinfection of T. trichiura with other parasites is common and with larger worm burdens can cause both exacerbations of dangerous trichuriasis symptoms such as massive gastrointestinal bleeding (shown to be especially dramatic with coinfection with Salmonella typhi) and exacerbation of symptoms and pathogenesis of the other parasitic infection (as is typical with coinfection with Schistosoma mansoni, in which higher worm burden and liver egg burden is common). Parasitic coinfection with HIV/AIDS, tuberculosis, and malaria is also common, especially in Sub-Saharan Africa, and helminth coinfection adversely affects the natural history and progression of HIV/AIDS, tuberculosis, and malaria and can increase clinical malaria severity. In a study performed in Senegal, infections of soil-transmitted helminths like T. trichiura (as well as schistosome infections independently) showed enhanced risk and increased the incidence of malaria.

Heavy infestations may have bloody diarrhea. Long-standing blood loss may lead to iron-deficiency anemia. Vitamin A deficiency may also result due to infection.

== Cause ==
Trichuriasis is caused by a parasitic worm also known as a helminth called Trichuris trichiura. It belongs to the genus Trichuris, formerly known as Trichocephalus, meaning hair head, which would be a more accurate name; however the generic name is now Trichuris, which means hair tail (implying that the posterior end of the worm is the attenuated section). Infections by parasitic worms are known as helminthiasis.

=== Reservoir ===
Humans are the main, but not the only reservoir for T. trichiura. Recent research verified by the application of molecular techniques (PCR) that dogs are a reservoir for T. trichiura, as well as T. vulpis.

=== Vector ===
Non-biting cyclorrhaphan flies (Musca domestica, M. sorbens, Chrysomya rufifacies, C. bezziana, Lucina cuprina, Calliphora vicina and Wohlfarthia magnifica) have been found to carry Trichuris trichiura. A study in two localized areas in Ethiopia found cockroaches were carriers for several human intestinal parasites, including T. trichiura.

Nevertheless, Trichuriasis is not considered a vector-borne disease as transmission primarily occurs through ingestion of embryonated eggs from contaminated soil or food. Insects such as flies and cockroaches act as mechanical carriers.

=== Transmission ===
Humans can become infected with the parasite due to ingestion of infective eggs by mouth contact with hands or food contaminated with egg-carrying soil. However, there have also been rare reported cases of transmission of T. trichiura by sexual contact. Some major outbreaks have been traced to contaminated vegetables (due to presumed soil contamination).

=== Life cycle ===
Unembryonated eggs (unsegmented) are passed in the feces of a previous host to the soil. In the soil, these eggs develop into a 2-cell stage (segmented egg) and then into an advanced cleavage stage. Once at this stage, the eggs embryonate and then become infective, a process that occurs in about 15 to 30 days). Next, the infective eggs are ingested by way of soil-contaminated hands or food and hatch inside the small intestine, releasing larvae into the gastrointestinal tract. These larvae burrow into a villus and develop into adults (over 2–3 days). They then migrate into the cecum and ascending colon where they thread their anterior portion (whip-like end) into the tissue mucosa and reside permanently for their year-long lifespan. About 60 to 70 days after infection, female adults begin to release unfertilized eggs (oviposit) into the cecum at a rate of 3,000 to 20,000 eggs per day, linking the life cycle to the start.

=== Incubation period ===
- The exact incubation period of T. trichiura is unknown, however, immature eggs in soil under favorable conditions take about three weeks to mature: 15–30 days, 10 days minimum to mature before ideal ingestion by the human host. Favorable conditions for maturation of eggs are warm to temperate climates with adequate humidity or precipitation, as ova are resistant to cold, but not resistant to drying.
- Once ingested, the larva will remain dug into a villus in the small intestine for about 2–3 days until it is fully developed for migration to the ileocecal section of the gastrointestinal tract.
- The average total life span of T. trichiura is one year, although there have been longer cases reported, lasting as long as five years (Note: inadequate treatment and re-infection are likely to play a role in this).

=== Morphology ===
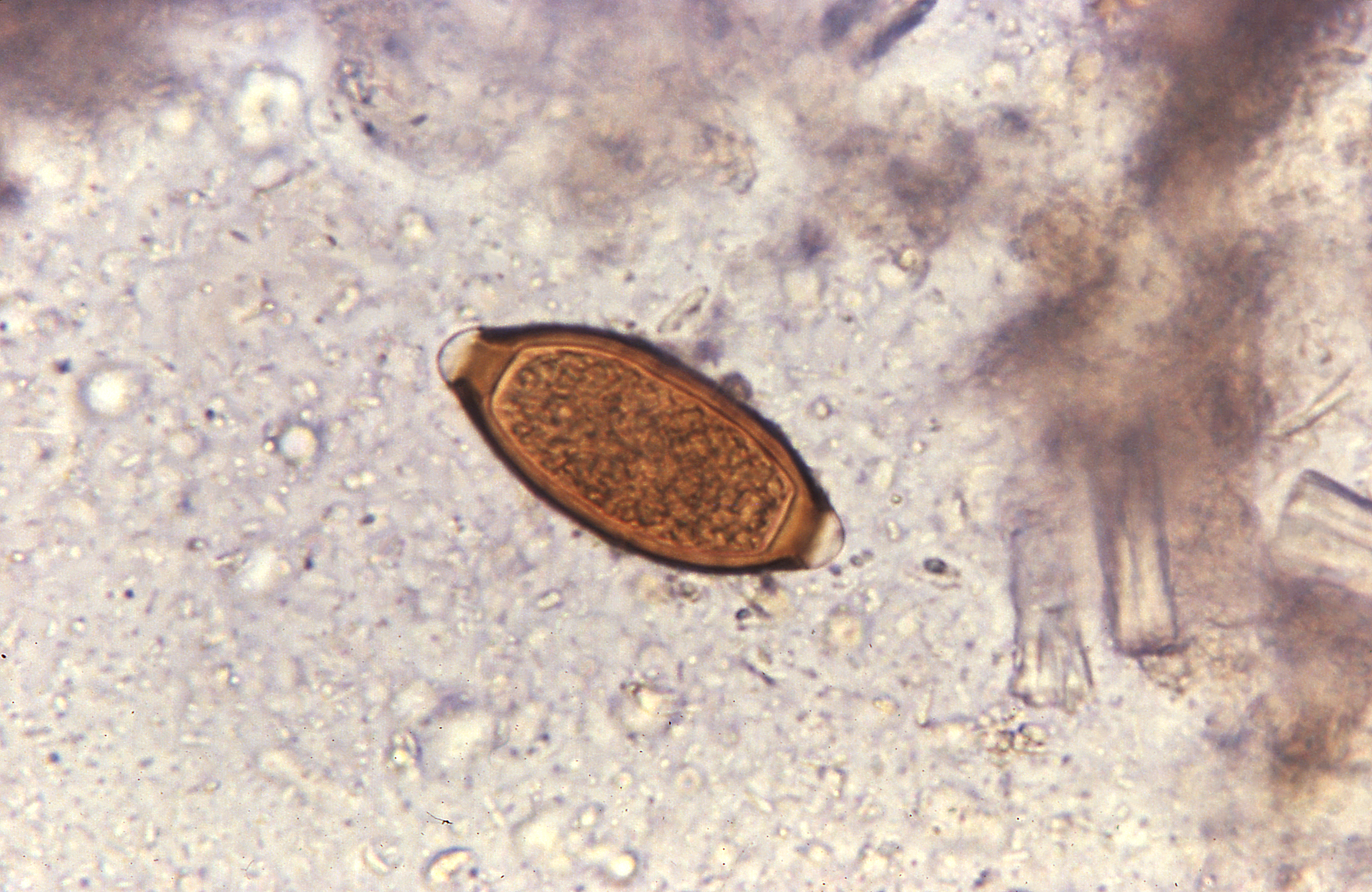
Trichuris trichiura egg

Adult worms are usually 3–5 centimetres (1.2–2.0 in) long, with females being larger than males as is typical of nematodes. The thin, clear majority of the body (the anterior, whip-like end) is the esophagus, and it is the end that the worm threads into the mucosa of the colon. The widened, pinkish-gray region of the body is the posterior, and it is the end that contains the parasite's intestines and reproductive organs. T. trichiura eggs are prolate spheroids, the shape of the balls used in Rugby and Gridiron football. They are about 50–54 μm (0.0020–0.0021 in) long and have polar plugs (also known as refractile prominences) at each end.

== Diagnosis ==
A stool ova and parasites exam reveals the presence of typical whipworm eggs. Typically, the Kato-Katz thick-smear technique is used for identification of the Trichuris trichiura eggs in the stool sample. Trichuria eggs often appear larger and more swollen on Kato-Katz preparation compared to when using other techniques.

Although colonoscopy is not typically used for diagnosis, as the adult worms can be overlooked, especially with an imperfect colon, there have been reported cases in which colonoscopy has revealed adult worms. Colonoscopy can directly diagnose trichuriasis by identification of the threadlike form of worms with an attenuated, whip-like end. Colonoscopy is a useful diagnostic tool, especially in patients infected with only a few male worms and with no eggs presenting in the stool sample.

Trichuriasis can be diagnosed when T. trichiura eggs are detected in stool examination. Eggs will appear barrel-shaped and unembryonated, having bipolar plugs and a smooth shell. Rectal prolapse can be diagnosed easily using defecating proctogram and is one of many methods for imaging the parasitic infection. Sigmoidoscopies show characteristic white bodies of adult worms hanging from inflamed mucosa ("coconut cake rectum").

== Prevention ==
=== Deworming ===
Limited access to essential medicine has made the eradication of trichuriasis worldwide challenging. Also, it is a public health concern that rates of post-treatment re-infection need to be determined and addressed to diminish the incidence of untreated re-infection. Lastly, with mass drug administration strategies improved diagnosis, and prompt treatment, the detection of an emergence of antihelminthic drug resistance should be examined.

Mass Drug Administration (preventative chemotherapy) has had a positive effect on the disease burden of trichuriasis in East and West Africa, especially among children, who are at highest risk for infection.

=== Sanitation ===
Infection can be avoided by proper disposal of human feces, avoiding fecal contamination of food, not eating soil, and avoiding crops fertilized with untreated human feces. Simple and effective proper hygiene such as washing hands and food is recommended for control.

Improved facilities for feces disposal have decreased the incidence of whipworm. Handwashing before food handling, and avoiding ingestion of soil by thorough washing of food that may have been contaminated with egg-containing soil are other preventive measures. In addition to washing, it is also advisable to peel and/or cook fruits and vegetables. Improvement of sanitation systems, as well as improved facilities for feces disposal, have helped to limit defecation onto soil and contain potentially infectious feces from bodily contact.

A study in a Brazilian urban centre demonstrated a significant reduction in the prevalence and incidence of soil-transmitted helminthiasis, including trichuriasis, following the implementation of a citywide sanitation program. A 33% reduction in the prevalence of trichuriasis and a 26% reduction in the incidence of trichuriasis was found in a study performed on 890 children ages 7–14 years old within 24 different sentinel areas chosen to represent the varied environmental conditions throughout the city of Salvador, Bahia, Brazil. Control of soil fertilizers has helped eliminate the potential for contact with human fecal matter and fertilizer in the soil.

== Treatment ==
Trichuriasis is treated with benzimidazole anthelmintic agents such as albendazole or mebendazole, sometimes in conjunction with other medications. Mebendazole is 90% effective in the first dose. Higher clearance rates can be obtained by combining mebendazole or albendazole with ivermectin or moxidectin.

The safety of ivermectin in children under 15 kg (33 lb) and pregnant women has not yet been established. In people with diarrhea, loperamide may be added to increase the contact time between anthelmintic agents and the parasites. Oral iron supplementation may be useful in treating the iron-deficiency anemia which often accompanies trichuriasis.

In Kenya, half of a group of children, 98% of whom had Trichuris trichiura with or without infections by other soil-transmitted helminths, were given albendazole, while the other half of the children received placebos. It was found that the children who received the drug grew significantly better than the group of children who did not receive the treatment.

However, it has been shown that both albendazole and mebendazole have low cure rate for Trichuris trichiura specifically, with treatments only achieving cure rates 30.7% for albendazole and 42.1% for mebendazole.

In 2025, a trial on over 200 children in Tanzania has shown a 69% cure rate after a single dose of a combination of moxidectin and albendazole, compared to 16% with albendazole alone.

== Epidemiology ==
Disability-adjusted life year for trichuriasis per 100,000 inhabitants in 2004 no data less than 5 5-10 10-15 15-20 20-25 25-30 30-35 35-40 40-45 45-50 50-60 more than 60

=== Regions ===
Infection of T. trichiura is most frequent in areas with tropical weather and poor sanitation practices. Trichuriasis occurs frequently in areas in which untreated human feces is used as fertilizer or where open defecation takes place. Trichuriasis infection prevalence can reach high levels in endemic regions, with high infection rates being reported in some Asian populations, particularly in areas with poor sanitation. It also occurs in rural areas of the southeastern United States.

=== Infection estimates ===
T. trichiura is the third most common nematode (roundworm) infecting humans. Infection is most prevalent among children, and in North America, infection occurs frequently in immigrants from tropical or sub-tropical regions. It is estimated that 600–800 million people are infected with Trichuris trichiura worldwide, while more than 3 billion individuals at risk of soil-transmitted helminths because they live in endemic regions.

== Research ==
Development of subunit vaccines requires the identification of protective antigens and their formulation in a suitable adjuvant. Trichuris muris is an antigenically similar laboratory model for T. trichiura. Subcutaneous vaccination with adult excretory-secretory products (ES) protects susceptible mouse strains from T. muris. Larval stages may contain novel and more relevant antigens which when incorporated in a vaccine induce worm expulsion earlier in infection than the adult worm products. Nematode vaccines marketed to date have been of the irradiated larval type and used exclusively for the treatment of animals. These vaccines are unstable and require annual production, involving the yearly production and sacrifice of donor animals for passage. There has been much interest in producing subunit vaccines against human and agricultural parasites since the early 1980s. Development of subunit vaccines requires the identification of protective antigens and their formulation with a suitable adjuvant to stimulate the immune response appropriately.

Recent molecular studies have identified a genetically distinct Trichuris species that is infecting humans. In West Africa, a proposed new specie of Trichuris called Trichuris incognita was found in human feces. These finding suggest that there may be greater diversity of this parasite than previously recognized. Identification of this distinct species could have implications for potential zoonotic transmission of disease.
