= Trichuris muris =

Scientific classification
- Kingdom: Animalia
- Phylum: Nematoda
- Class: Enoplea
- Order: Trichocephalida
- Family: Trichuridae
- Genus: Trichuris
- Species: T. muris

Binomial name
- Trichuris muris (Schrank, 1788)

Species of roundworm

Trichuris muris is a nematode parasite of mice. It is similar enough to the human roundworm parasite Trichuris trichiura to show immunological cross-reactivity, and so is often used in related studies.

== Lifecycle ==
Ingesting material that contains embryonated eggs allows for transmission and infection to occur. The eggs travel down to the cecum - a pouch located at the start of the large intestine - where larval hatching is induced. The larvae proceed to penetrate through the mucosal epithelium, then molt into their secondary stage of infection after 9–11 days. About 17 days after infection, the larvae arrive at the tertiary stage followed by a quaternary molt 5 days later. The larvae complete their last molt 29 days after infection and transform into mature dioecious adults. These whipworms use their anterior ends to embed themselves into the cells that line the walls of the large intestine. After establishing their place in the intestinal wall, the adult worms mate and release unembryonated eggs into the environment via the feces.

Trichuris muris relies on direct contact with intestinal bacteria to promote hatching of the embryonated eggs. Using green fluorescent protein (GFP) and E. coli strains, the bacteria are seen to gather specifically around the opercula, which are located at the poles of the eggs. The bacteria contain type 1 fimbriae, which possess adhesin FimH at their fimbrial tips. FimH interacts with a mannosylated receptor found on the egg's surface. When bound, a signal transduction cascade is triggered and results in the worm emerging from the egg. Temperature, in particular at 37 °C, serves as an additional hatching cue; this specific temperature is thought to prevent T. muris eggs from hatching in unideal outside environments.

The relationship between T. muris and bacteria also has a significant effect on the host's immune response. The activation of type 2 helper cells (Th2) is decreased in the presence of antibiotics because fewer whipworms bind to the intestinal walls. This, in turn, drives up the proliferation and differentiation of Th17 and Th1 cells. About 18 days after infection, the worm burden in antibiotically treated mice was drastically reduced, further supporting the notion that bacteria are essential to the worms' establishment.

== See also ==
- Heligmosomoides polygyrus
- Nippostrongylus brasiliensis
