= Trichuris serrata =

Scientific classification
- Kingdom: Animalia
- Phylum: Nematoda
- Class: Enoplea
- Subclass: Dorylaimia
- Order: Trichocephalida
- Family: Trichuridae
- Genus: Trichuris
- Species: T. serrata

Binomial name
- Trichuris serrata von Linstow, 1879

Species of roundworm

Trichuris serrata, commonly known as a whipworm, is a nematode of the genus Trichuris first discovered in domestic Brazilian cats by Dr. Otto Friedrich Bernhard von Linstow in 1879. Since then, there have been reports of this species in North and South America, Australia, and the Caribbean islands. Information regarding the species' general life cycle and egg development can be seen in the Trichuris page.

== Morphology and relationship to T. campanula ==
During the early 1900s, many considered the only legitimate feline whipworm species to be T. serrata. However, another feline whipworm species known as T. campanula was also discovered. Whipworms of T. serrata are slightly bigger than those of T. campanula. Male and female lengths of T. serrata are 40 and 48mm respectively, while their T. campanula counterparts are 20.5 and 31.5mm respectively. However, the eggs of T. serrata are marginally smaller than those of T. campanula. The egg morphologies of both species are identical and have a light brown color and a lemon shape. Despite the size difference, studies have discovered that the best form of differentiation between the two species can be seen in the anatomy of their females. In 1975, it was discovered that female organisms of T. serrata have a fingerlike projection from the vulva while their T. campanula counterparts have two longitudinal lips on that sex organ. Both have a bacillary band, although based on the original description that of T. serrata is more obvious than T. campanula

== Treatment and diagnosis ==
There are no clinical symptoms associated with whipworm infections in felines. Diagnosis of cats with these infections is usually through fecal flotation and an ELISA antigen test. To treat them, veterinarians recommend feeding the cats 50 mg/kg of fenbendazole once a day for three days. Although they are very infectious between cats, there are no recorded cases of T. serrata infecting humans.
