= Trichuris discolor =

Scientific classification
- Kingdom: Animalia
- Phylum: Nematoda
- Class: Enoplea
- Order: Trichocephalida
- Family: Trichuridae
- Genus: Trichuris
- Species: T. discolor

Binomial name
- Trichuris discolor (von Linstow, 1906)

Species of roundworm

Trichuris discolor, commonly known as a whipworm, is a nematode belonging to the genus Trichuris. The species was discovered by Otto Friedrich Bernhard von Linstow in 1906 and primarily infects cows. However, they can also infect sheep and goats. Like Trichuris ovis, T. discolor is known to be located in any region that their hosts are located. There have been specific reports of this species being found in Japan, Indo-Pakistan, and North America. Information regarding the species' general life cycle and egg development can be seen in the Trichuris page.

== Morphology and differentiation from T. ovis ==
Despite inhabiting the same hosts, T. discolor and T. ovis are distinct species. The size of male and female T. discolor whipworms are 33.9-50.68mm and 36.0—59.0mm respectively. The spicule of T. discolor is 0.94-1.30mm long and has a rounded tip, whereas the spicule of T. ovis is 4.18-5.62mm long and has a pointed tip. In addition to the spicule, the female sex organs can be used to differentiate the two species. T. ovis females have everted vaginas, while those of T. discolor do not. Despite these morphological differences between the two species, there are still situations where the two species cannot be easily differentiated. Therefore, the mitochondrial DNA of both species was encoded. Results confirm that the two species are indeed distinct from each other.

== Symptoms and treatment ==
Hosts are relatively resistant to Trichuris infections and rarely display any distinct symptoms. However, severe infections can result in severe diarrhea, anorexia, recumbency, dehydration, and weight loss. Adult whipworms primarily inhabit and feed on the mucosa of the cecum, which causes a thickening of the cecal wall. This prevents liquids from being absorbed, thus explaining the diarrhea. The main methods of diagnosing a host with a Trichuris infection are through fecal flotation, which detects eggs, and postmortem examination of the large intestine. Severe infections can be treated through anthelmintic medications, such as levamisole and methylridine.
