= Trichuris navonae =

Scientific classification
- Domain: Eukaryota
- Kingdom: Animalia
- Phylum: Nematoda
- Class: Enoplea
- Order: Trichocephalida
- Family: Trichuridae
- Genus: Trichuris
- Species: T. navonae

Binomial name
- Trichuris navonae Robles, 2011

Species of roundworm

Trichuris navonae is parasite found in forest dwelling mice, Akodon montensis, in South America, specifically within the Paranaense Forest. To date, twenty-two Trichuris species have been described.

== Morphology ==
Trichuris navonae has a long and narrow whip-like anterior body. Its posterior body is broad and hand-like. Males and females exhibit 1:1.2-1:1.4 ratio between anterior and posterior body length. T. navonae have several features that distinguish them as a distinct species. These distinguishable features include a cylindrical spicular sheath with sharp and fused spines, the absence of a spicular tube, and a non-protrusive vulva.
