= Albendazole monooxygenase =

Class of enzymes

Identifiers
- EC no.: 1.14.13.32
- CAS no.: 101299-59-6

Databases
- BRENDA: enzyme data
- ExPASy: NiceZyme view
- KEGG: enzyme entry
- MetaCyc: metabolic pathway
- Rhea: reactions
- PDB structures: RCSB PDB PDBe PDBsum
- Gene Ontology: AmiGO / QuickGO
Search
- PMC: articles
- PubMed: articles
- NCBI: proteins

Albendazole monooxygenase (EC 1.14.13.32) is an enzyme that catalyzes the chemical reaction

albendazole
+ NADPH + H^{+}
O_{2}
H_{2}O
ricobendazole
+ NADP^{+}

The four substrates of this enzyme are albendazole, reduced nicotinamide adenine dinucleotide phosphate (NADPH), oxygen and a proton. Its products are ricobendazole (albendazole S-oxide), oxidised NADP^{+}, and water.

This enzyme is coded by the gene for FMO3 and is a flavin-containing monooxygenase that uses molecular oxygen as oxidant and incorporates one of its atoms into the starting material. The systematic name of this enzyme class is albendazole,NADPH:oxygen oxidoreductase (sulfoxide-forming). Other names in common use include albendazole oxidase, and albendazole sulfoxidase. It employs one cofactor, flavin adenine dinucleotide.

== See also ==
A similar oxidation is carried out by EC 1.14.14.73, albendazole monooxygenase (sulfoxide-forming), which in humans is known to be carried out by CYP3A4 and CYP2J2.
