= Ricobendazole =

Chemical compound

Clinical data
- Trade names: Rycoben

Identifiers
- IUPAC name: methyl [6-(propylsulfinyl)-1H-benzimidazol-2-yl]carbamate
- CAS Number: 54029-12-8
- PubChem CID: 83969
- DrugBank: DB13871
- ChemSpider: 75767
- UNII: J39B52TV34
- KEGG: D07106
- ChEBI: CHEBI:16959
- ChEMBL: ChEMBL1665
- CompTox Dashboard (EPA): DTXSID4057768
- ECHA InfoCard: 100.157.043

Chemical and physical data
- Formula: C_{12}H_{15}N_{3}O_{3}S
- Molar mass: 281.33 g·mol^{−1}
- 3D model (JSmol): Interactive image
- SMILES: CCCS(=O)c1ccc2[nH]c(NC(=O)OC)nc2c1
- InChI: InChI=1S/C12H15N3O3S/c1-3-6-19(17)8-4-5-9-10(7-8)14-11(13-9)15-12(16)18-2/h4-5,7H,3,6H2,1-2H3,(H2,13,14,15,16); Key:VXTGHWHFYNYFFV-UHFFFAOYSA-N

Ricobendazole, also known as albendazole S-oxide, is a broad-spectrum benzimidazole anthelmintic. Its main use is for protecting livestock against nematode parasites. Ricobendazole is the active sulfoxide metabolite of albendazole.

Like mebendazole, ricobendazole inhibits tubulin polymerization.

== Metabolic product of albendazole ==
Ricobendazole is produced in many species and in human liver when albendazole undergoes first-pass metabolism by the enzymes albendazole monooxygenase (sulfoxide-forming) (a cytochrome P450 oxidase) or albendazole monooxygenase (a flavin-containing monooxygenase.

albendazole
ricobendazole
