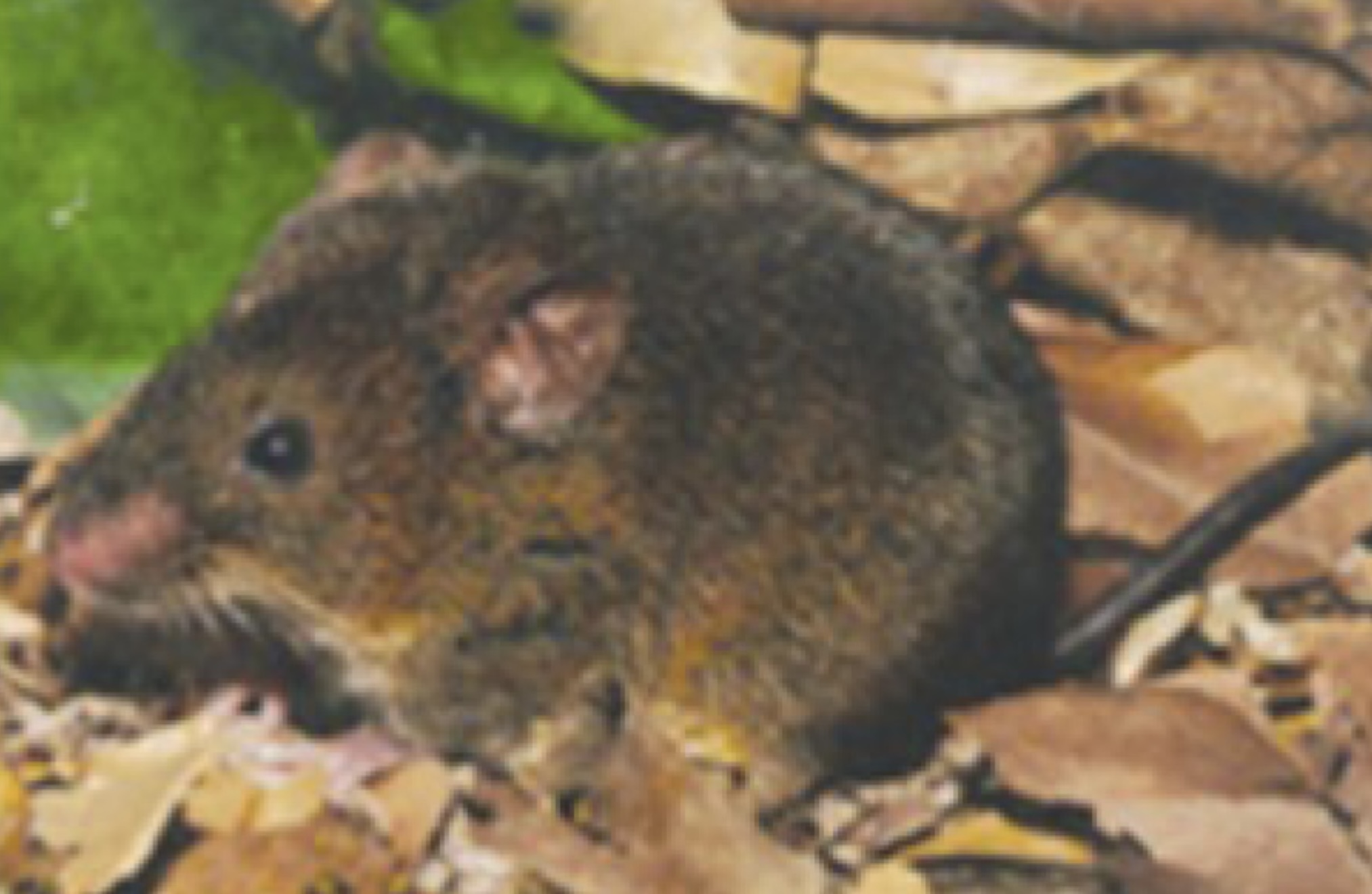

Conservation status
- Least Concern (IUCN 3.1)

Scientific classification
- Kingdom: Animalia
- Phylum: Chordata
- Class: Mammalia
- Infraclass: Placentalia
- Order: Rodentia
- Family: Cricetidae
- Subfamily: Sigmodontinae
- Genus: Akodon
- Species: A. montensis

Binomial name
- Akodon montensis Thomas, 1913

Synonyms
- Akodon arviculoides montensis

= Montane grass mouse =

Species of rodent in South America

The montane grass mouse (Akodon montensis) is a rodent species from South America. It is found in Argentina, Brazil, Paraguay and Uruguay.

== See also ==
- Trichuris navonae, a parasite of A. montensis
