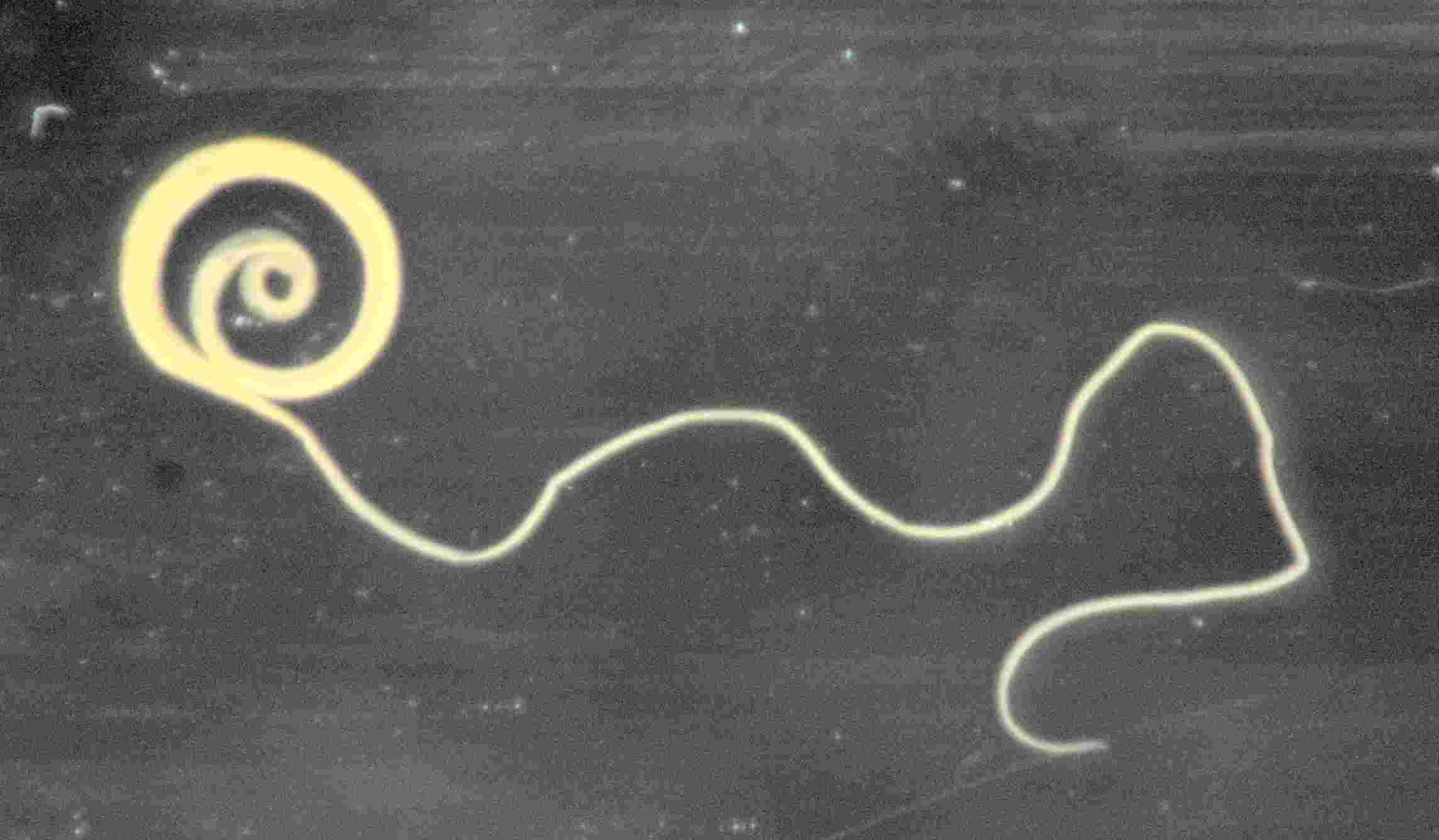

Scientific classification
- Kingdom: Animalia
- Phylum: Nematoda
- Class: Enoplea
- Order: Trichocephalida
- Family: Trichuridae
- Genus: Trichuris
- Species: T. suis

Binomial name
- Trichuris suis Schrank, 1788

= Trichuris suis =

Species of roundworm

Trichuris suis is a whipworm; the variations in thickness of the anterior and posterior segments give the parasite the characteristic "whip-like" appearance. Adult females measure 6 to 8 cm and adult males 3 to 4 cm. T. suis eggs are oval (60 × 25 μm) and yellow-brown with bipolar plugs. T. suis is also used in helminthic therapy studies.

== Lifecycle ==
The lifecycle of T. suis is direct and does not require any intermediate host. Eggs are passed in feces from infected animals, but are single-celled and are not initially infectious. Infective J1 stage larvae develop within the shell in 3 weeks to 2 months, depending on environmental temperature. The infective J1 stage within the egg is highly resistant and can remain in this form for several years in favorable conditions. Once the infective J1 egg is ingested, the bipolar plugs are digested and the J1 larvae hatch in the small intestine and cecum. The J1 larvae penetrate the mucosa via the crypts of Lieberkühn in the distal ileum, cecum, and colon. During the next 5 weeks, the larvae undergo four molts (J2, J3, J4, J5) to the adult stage within the mucosal layers. The adult's thicker posterior third then emerges through the mucosal surface into the lumen, while the thin anterior two-thirds remains embedded in the mucosal layers. Adults can be recovered from the distal ileum to the rectum, but most are located in the cecum and proximal colon. The prepatent period is 6 to 8 weeks and lifespan is 4 to 5 months.

== Epidemiology ==
Pigs are the natural host for T. suis, but it can also affect other species - including people. Humans probably become infected with T. suis by ingesting contaminated soil or water. T. suis is found worldwide, but is most prevalent in warm, humid climates. It is rare or nonexistent in arid, very hot, or very cold regions.

== Pathology and symptoms ==
In adult pigs, infections with T. suis can cause diarrhea, anorexia, anemia, poor growth, dehydration, and emaciation, but acuteness is usually connected to the infective dose or concurrent bacterial enteritis. Dysentery, anemia, and death have also been described in infections in younger pigs. Critical infestations of T. suis may cause acute morbidity and mortality in young female pigs.

T. suis has been shown in trials to colonize humans briefly without triggering infections.

== Diagnosis ==
In pigs T. suis egg production is sporadic, complicating diagnosis by fecal flotation. Necropsy of clinical cases of trichuriasis may be necessary to validate a diagnosis, since clinical signs may develop prior to patency, thus inhibiting diagnosis by fecal examination alone. On gross necropsy, the intestine may be filled with semisolid to watery to bloody mucoid feces, depending on acuteness of the infection and simultaneous bacterial infections. The anterior portion of adult worms may be observable breaching the cecal and colonic mucosa. Inflammatory nodules may be seen adjacent to the adults where they penetrate the mucosa. In earlier infections, the nodules may suggest pre-erupted larvae beneath the mucosa. Depending on the acuteness of infection, there is generalized moderate to severe typhlitis and colitis. In severe infections, the walls of the intestine may be thickened and a necrotic membrane may be located on the surface of the mucosa.

== Treatment ==
The pathogenicity and symptoms are generally mild in human and it can be treated with medicines such as doramectin, ivermectin, and febantel.

Although no treatment is initiated for pigs that are infected with T. suis due to the lack of clinical impact, piperazine can be applied to minimize the negative impact that the parasite reflects on the host.

== Helminthic therapy ==
T. suis ova therapy may produce significant and long-lasting improvements in active Crohn's disease. In a study conducted at the University of Iowa, patients who had been administered with T. suis ova for 24 weeks had a response rate of nearly 80% and a remission rate of nearly 73%. Crohn's disease involves over reactive Th1 pathways and colonization with parasitic worms expands several immunoregulatory pathways that limit Th1-type inflammation. Parasitic worms generate production of interleukin 4 and interleukin 13, which are Th2 cytokines. This Th2 response restrains production of Th1 cytokines, thereby reducing colitis severity. Parasitic worms also generate regulatory T cells and immune regulatory substances such as transforming growth factor β, interleukin 10, and prostaglandin E2 that assist in sustaining host mucosal homeostasis.

However, a recent larger RCT has shown no effect on Crohn's disease in comparison to placebo.

The U.S. Food and Drug Administration has granted pig whipworm (Trichuris suis) the status of Investigational New Drug, allowing clinical trials in humans.

=== Allergic rhinitis ===
In a 2010 randomized double-blind placebo clinical trial, T. suis induced immune response, but did nothing for the allergic symptoms.

== Prevention and control ==
Prevention of T. suis depends on the treatment and prevention of infections in animals, the removal of feces before the eggs can become embryonated, good hygiene, and public education.
