= Cysticercus =

Larval tapeworm

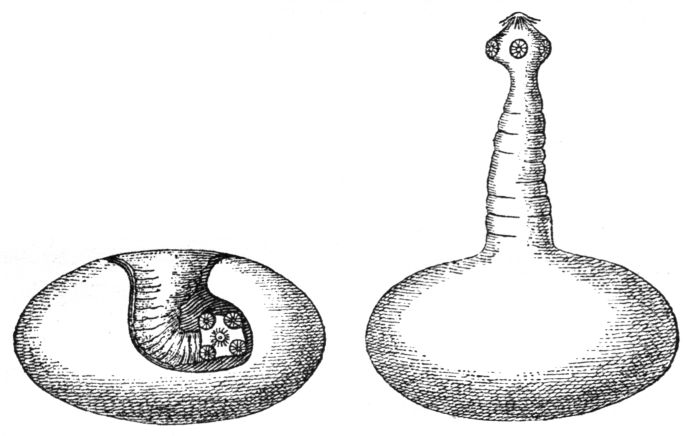
Drawing of Cysticerus cellulosae: Left one from the pig showing an invaginated scolex. Right one from human intestine showing the evaginated scolex.

Cysticercus (pl. cysticerci) is a scientific name given to the young tapeworms (larvae) belonging to the genus Taenia. It is a small, sac-like vesicle resembling a bladder; hence, it is also known as bladder worm. It is filled with fluid, in which the main body of the larva, called scolex (which will eventually form the head of the tapeworm), resides. It normally develops from the eggs, which are ingested by the intermediate hosts, such as pigs and cattle. The tissue infection is called cysticercosis. Inside such hosts, they settle in the muscles. When humans eat raw or undercooked pork or beef that is contaminated with cysticerci, the larvae grow into adult worms inside the intestine. Under certain circumstances, specifically for the pork tapeworm, the eggs can be accidentally eaten by humans through contaminated foodstuffs. In such case, the eggs hatch inside the body, generally moving to muscles as well as inside the brain. Such brain infection can lead to a serious medical condition called neurocysticercosis. This disease is the leading cause of acquired epilepsy.

== Discovery and naming system ==
Cysticercus was discovered in the late 17th century CE as a parasitic bladder worm. It was believed to be a different organism from the adult tapeworm (Taenia solium), but still closely related to tapeworms for their similar-looking scolices. Hence, it was given a proper scientific name Taenia cellulosae in 1800 by German naturalist Johann Friedrich Gmelin. At the same time, another German, Johann Zeder, had created a new genus Cysticercus for a dog tapeworm. This genus was accepted for all bladder worms of Taenia. It became a tradition to refer to the larvae of Taenia solium as Cysticercus cellulosae, that of beef tapeworm (T. saginata) as Cysticercus bovis, that of sheep tapeworm (T. ovis) as Cysticercus ovis, that of ruminant tapeworm (T. krabbei) as Cysticercus tarandi, and that of the dog tapeworm (T. crassiceps) as Cysticercus longicollis. Though this system of naming is now scientifically unacceptable, it is still widely used, particularly for description of the infections by the different species.

== Structure ==
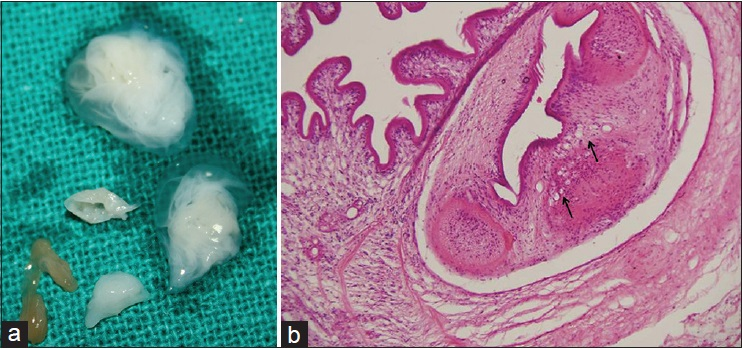
Resected gross specimen of cysticercus from the human brain, (a) and photomicrograph of hematoxylin and eosin stained section, (b) cysticercus cellulosae with an undulating bladder wall and scolex. Three suckers along with rows of hooklets (arrow) can be identified on the scolex (×200, original magnification).

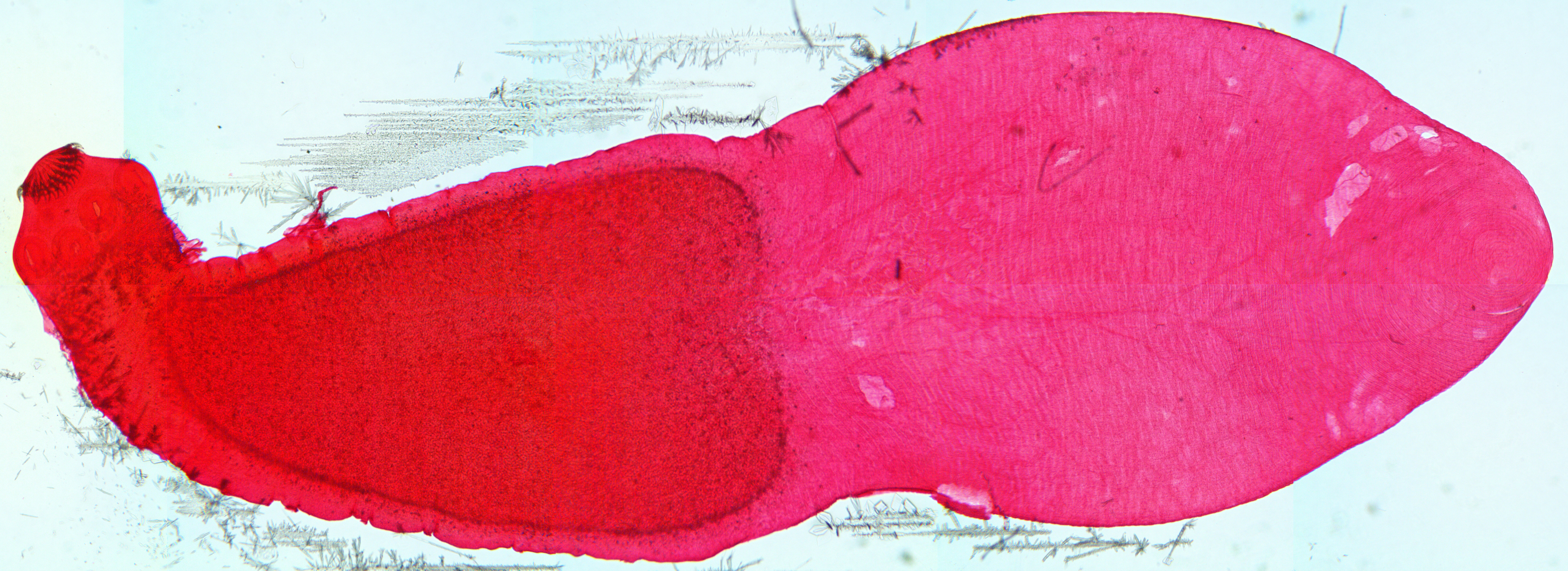
Taemia pisiformis cysticercus E. (Actual length on slide 12.5mm. ×40, original magnification)

A cysticercus is a bladder-like transparent vesicle. It is composed of two main parts: the vesicular wall and a scolex. The vesicular wall is a complex structure made up of three distinct layers. The outermost is a smooth and undifferentiated layer called cuticular mantle. The middle is composed of cells that resemble epithelial cells. The innermost is made up of muscle and other fibres. Inside the vesicular wall is an invaginated (facing inward) scolex. The scolex contains suckers and hooks, and a neck attached to a rudimentary body segment.

== Pathogenicity ==
In the normal life cycle of Taenia, cysticerci develop in the muscles of the intermediate hosts such as pigs, cattle, and sheep. In these animals, they do not cause severe symptoms. They are transmitted to humans when their infected meats are eaten. However, T. solium is unusual because its cysticerci can develop in humans. Due to accidental consumption of the eggs from contaminated foodstuffs, cysticerci in humans produce clinical symptoms, cysticercosis. Thus, humans are accidental intermediate hosts.
