= Trichuris ovis =

Scientific classification
- Kingdom: Animalia
- Phylum: Nematoda
- Class: Enoplea
- Order: Trichocephalida
- Family: Trichuridae
- Genus: Trichuris
- Species: T. ovis

Binomial name
- Trichuris ovis (Abildgaard, 1795)

Species of roundworm

Trichuris ovis, commonly known as a whipworm, is a nematode belonging to the genus Trichuris. This whipworm species was first discovered in 1795 and is known to infect sheep and goats. These organisms are capable of inhabiting any region that has the aforementioned hosts, as can be attested by the numerous reports of T. ovis findings throughout North and South America, Australia, Europe, and Asia. Information regarding the species' general life cycle and egg development can be seen in the Trichuris page.

== Morphology ==
This species of whipworm is white and is known to have a long, thin neck that composes two-thirds of its body, and a short, thick posterior. The male organisms of T. ovis usually range from 53.04mm-75.08mm in length, while their female counterparts are approximately 32.03-70.19mm in length. The spicule length is 4.18-5.62mm for both genders. Both genders also have bacillary bands. T. ovis that inhabit different species of sheep or goats can have slightly different morphologies.

== Symptoms and treatment ==
Like all whipworms, T. ovis primarily inhabit the host’s cecum. However, sheep and goats are rather resistant to the parasite infection and often do not experience many symptoms. If the host is heavily infected, a large portion of the blood vessels located in the cecal wall will be consumed. This eventually results in the thickening of the wall, thus preventing that region of the large intestine from absorbing fluids causing the host to have diarrhea. This can be extremely detrimental for the host during a drought. Although sheep and goats are relatively resistant to them, T. ovis is one of the most common nematode parasites, and many of the aforementioned hosts are infected by this species of whipworm. As a result, farmers began treating infected livestock with anthelmintics, an internal pesticide, in hopes of eradicating these infections. Unfortunately, there have been cases reported where the parasites are resistant to these treatments, thus prompting researchers to develop potential vaccines to combat such resistant whipworms.
