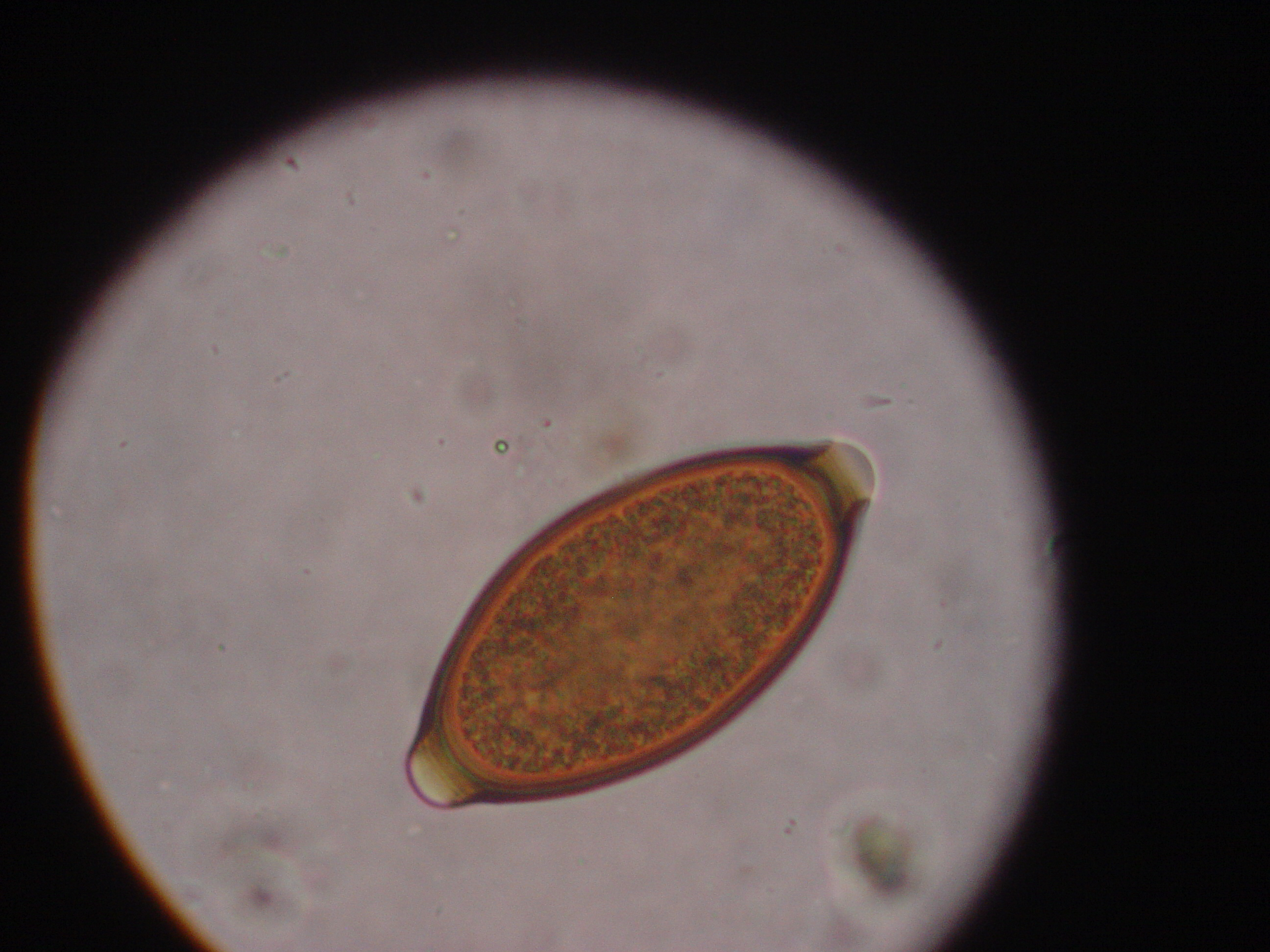

Scientific classification
- Kingdom: Animalia
- Phylum: Nematoda
- Class: Enoplea
- Order: Trichocephalida
- Family: Trichuridae
- Genus: Trichuris
- Species: T. vulpis

Binomial name
- Trichuris vulpis Froelich, 1789

= Trichuris vulpis =

Species of roundworm

Trichuris vulpis is a whipworm that lives in the large intestine of canines in its adult stages. Out of different types of worms, Trichuris vulpis is one of the smaller worms with a size ranging from 30–50 mm in length. As the name suggests, the worm has a whip-like shape with distinct features including a small, narrow anterior head, which is the digestive part of the worm, and a larger posterior tail, which is the reproductive part of the worm. Eggs from T. vulpis are oval shaped with bipolar plugs and contain a thick outer shell. Their sizes range from 72–90 μm in length and 32–40 μm in width. Because of their thick outer shell, T. vulpis eggs are very resistant to environmental extremes such as freezing or hot temperatures, thus allowing for their long viability in the outside world.

== Life cycle ==
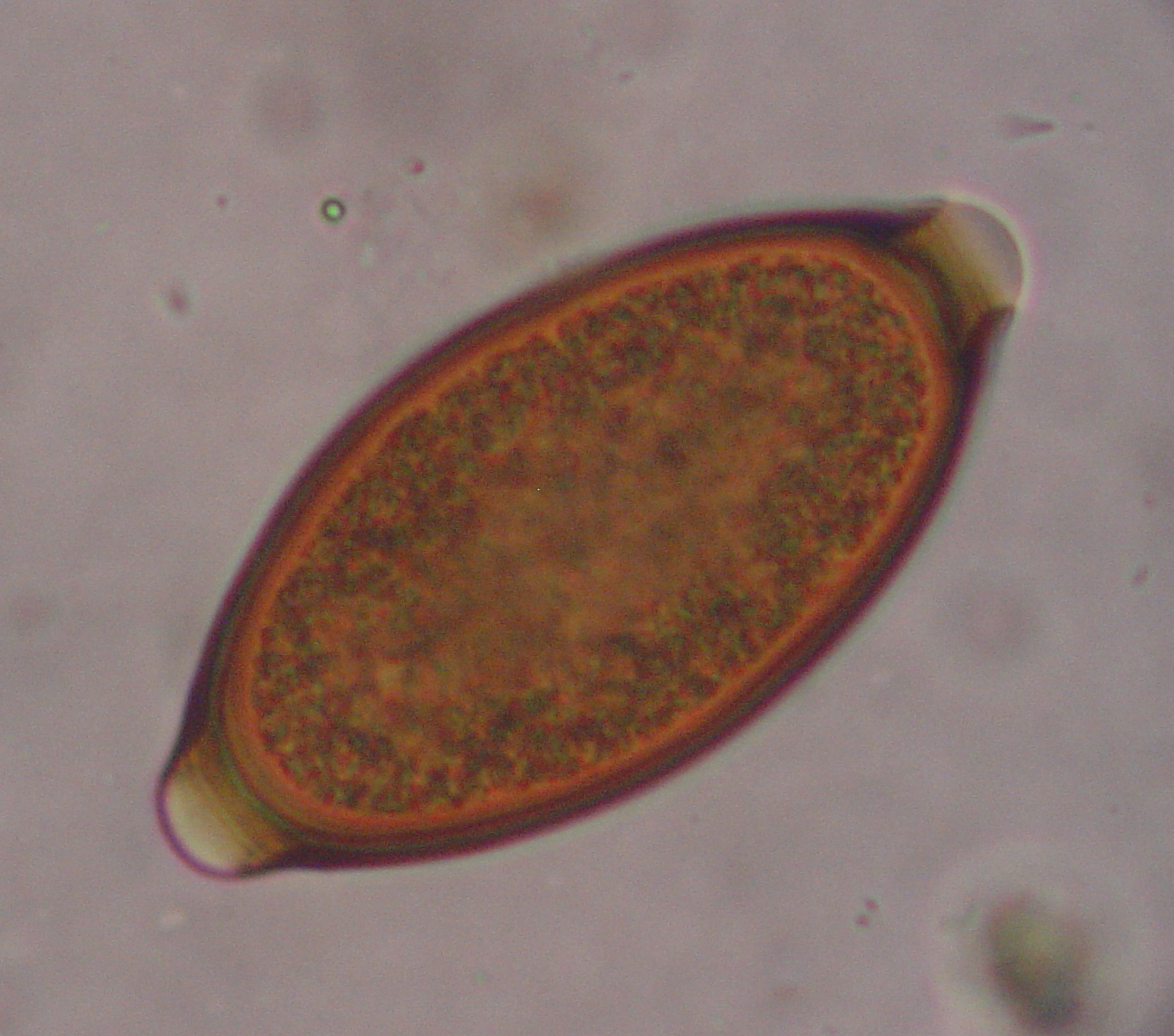
Egg of T. vulpis

The life cycle of Trichuris vulpis begins with the adult whipworms living in the large intestines of dogs. T. vulpis lay many eggs in the large intestine and are released in the feces into the outside environment. When eggs are released into the outside environment, these unembryonated eggs are able to form embryos in the soil in about 2–4 weeks, at which point they become infective when ingested by the new host. An infective larva develops within the egg before it is even ingested by the new host.

Another canine becomes a new host by ingesting the egg containing the larva. Once ingested, the egg invade the cells of the Crypts of Leiberkuhn in the colon. The J3 larvae grow and molt while burrowing in the epithelium toward the luminal surface. These worms can invade intestinal cells in many places, but there is no evidence that worms can develop to maturity except in the cells of the colon, or that worms develop in the duodenum and migrate to the colon. Once an adult, their posterior end enlarges (the 'handle of a whip') and bursts into the lumen of the colon. The whip-like anterior end remains in the cells of the large intestinal walls. Adult whipworms live inside the cecum, colon, and rectum for about three months before they lay eggs intermittently to be released in feces where they can become infective to another host.

== Epidemiology ==
T. vulpis infects canines worldwide. In the United States, it has been reported that 14.3% of shelter dogs are infected with this parasite. Older dogs normally have a higher infection of these worms than younger dogs. Though rare, there are some cases of human infection. The eggs of T. vulpis are prevalent in shady moist soil areas that have been contaminated by canine feces.

== Pathology/symptoms ==
Because the eggs of T. vulpis eggs are very resistant from desiccation, they can live in soil for up to seven years. Once ingested by the canine, the eggs hatch and the resulted larvae live in the small intestine. At this point, though infected, the canine is still asymptomatic. When adult form, T. vulpis live primarily in the cecum with its anterior end attached to the superficial mucosa and its posterior end extended to the cecal lumen where it consumes the canine's blood, tissue fluid, and mucosal epithelium. Results of eosinophilia and hypoproteinemia may be found in clinical hematology. Severe infections include symptoms such as bloody diarrhea, weight loss, dehydration, and anemia, and in extreme cases, death.

In the rare cases that T. vulpis infects humans, it can cause visceral larva migrans (VLM) which presents as eosinophilia, hepatomegaly, and pulmonary symptoms. More cases of VLM have been documented in children with the diagnosis based on the larger size of the eggs found in stool samples. However, cases have been documented in adults as well.

== Diagnosis ==
Infection of this parasite can be confirmed with detection of eggs in the canine's feces. Adult T. vulpis females can produce more than 2,000 eggs per day. These eggs can be detected in the canine's feces by the fecal flotation method. This method utilizes the differences of specific gravity of eggs, fecal debris, and the flotation solution. Although these eggs are dense, the use of proper fecal flotation technique using a sugar solution and centrifugation can increase the chances of identifying these eggs in a fecal sample. Multiple fecal samples may need to be tested as the eggs may be shed periodically.

== Treatment ==
Infection of this parasite can be treated with several drugs including febantel, fenbendazole, milbemycin, moxidectin (topical), and oxantel. Dogs require re-treatment monthly for 3 treatments due to the long prepatent period of this parasite. There are also monthly preventive treatments that can be used. These are usually one of the above drugs combined with a heartworm prevention drug. Removing fecal material that contains the Trichuris eggs is very important in preventing recurrence. Merck Veterinary Manual

== Prevention and control ==
Keeping canines away from contaminated areas, especially areas where there are feces can prevent them from contracting T. vulpis. There is no effective way to kill the parasite's eggs in the soil, so it is might be necessary to replace the soil and cleaning out litter boxes and kennels frequently. People cleaning these areas should wear gloves and wash their hands after the task.

Dogs should have fecal examinations and deworming as necessary. If a dog is detected to be infected with T. vulpis, it should be treated immediately to prevent infection of other dogs. Their feces should also be cleaned up immediately in order to prevent the eggs from getting into the soil which could lead to the infection of others.
