= Withdrawal time =

Withdrawal time, as relating to veterinary medicine, is defined as the time required after administration of a drug to a dairy cow needed to assure that drug residues in the marketable milk is below a determined maximum residue limit (MRL). This term is often used more broadly to describe the time needed after drug administration to any food animal where drug residue may be found in marketed meats, eggs, organs, or other edible products.
