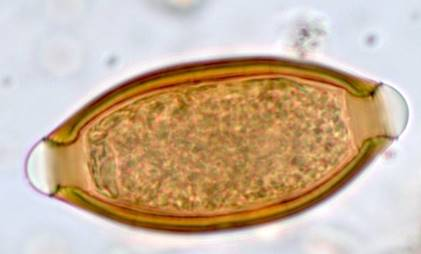
- Egg of Trichuris sp.

Scientific classification
- Kingdom: Animalia
- Phylum: Nematoda
- Class: Enoplea
- Order: Trichocephalida
- Family: Trichuridae
- Genus: Trichuris; Roederer, 1761

Species
- Several, see text

= Trichuris =

Genus of roundworms

Trichuris (synonym Trichocephalus), often referred to as whipworms or the silent serpent (which typically refers to T. trichiura only in medicine, and to any other species in veterinary medicine), is a genus of parasitic helminths from the roundworm family Trichuridae. The name whipworm refers to the shape of the worm; they look like whips with wider "handles" at the posterior end.

== Species ==
The genus Trichuris includes over 70 species, which infect the large intestine of their host, including:

- Trichuris trichiura (sometimes Trichocephalus trichiurus) – causes trichuriasis in humans
- Trichuris campanula (cat whipworm)
- Trichuris serrata (cat whipworm)
- Trichuris suis (pig whipworm)
- Trichuris muris (mouse whipworm)
- Trichuris vulpis (dog whipworm)

A new species – as yet unnamed – has been identified in François' leaf monkey (Trachypithecus francoisi).

Other species in this genus include Trichuris cynocephalus, Trichuris discolor, Trichuris laevitestis, Trichuris pardinasi, Trichuris navonae, Trichuris ovis, Trichuris rhinopithecus, Trichuris thrichomysi, and Trichuris travassosi.

Trichurias is a soil-transmitted helminthiasis and belongs to the group of neglected tropical diseases, affecting about 604 million people globally.

Researchers are currently facing difficulties completely differentiating the numerous species under the genus Trichuris. When different whipworm species were discovered, the main factor used to differentiate species was the length of the spicule sheath. However, many species were eventually discovered to have similar spicule sheath lengths. Therefore, researchers began to compare other morphologies, such as the structure or orientation surrounding female sex organs of species suspected to be similar, but different. Relatively recently, studies have been conducted to differentiate similar Trichuris species based on mitochondrial DNA differences, a much more accurate method of distinction. However, currently a paucity of research devoted to encoding the DNA of each and every species exists. As a result, Trichuris species distinction is still largely based on morphological differences.

== History ==
Whipworm infections were present in ancient times although no written accounts are available. The evidence is based on several mummies in Europe and Brazil that are found to contain the parasite eggs. One of the oldest known infection of an individual is that of Ötzi, a natural mummy of a man who lived between 3350 and 3105 BCE. The first recorded whipworm, T. trichiura was discovered by Italian pathologist Giovanni Battista Morgagni in 1740 (or 1739) from the intestine (the cecum and transverse colon) of an infected man. He reported the novel worm in 1741 in Epistolae Anatomicae (number XIV), which was published in 1764. However, without proper identification or name, his record was soon forgotten. In 1760-1761 medical course at the University of Göttingen, students dissected out the same parasites from the cecum of a young girl who died of typhoid fever. Johann Georg Roederer, professor of obstetrics, examined the worms and identified them as roundworms, giving the description and the name Trichuris (Greek θρίξ/thríx, for hair, and οὐρά/ourá, tail). However, Roederer mistook the thread-like head for the tail.

Swedish biologist Carl Linnaeus, dubbed the "father of modern taxonomy", came to learn of the worm from his accomplice Johann Beckmann, former student at Göttingen. Based on Beckman's report, Linnaeus described it as a worm related to the large human roundworm, Ascaris lumbricoides, which he had named in 1758. In 1771, Linnaeus grouped them as teretes, literally roundworms, and gave the first binominal name, Ascaris trichiura. German zoologist Johann August Ephraim Goeze realised that Linnaeus classification was erroneous and created a new genus Trichocephalos (literally hair/thread headed) in 1782, correctly identifying that the hair/thread-like body was the head part. But he did not give the full scientific name. Franz von Paula Schrank described the whipworm of pigs as Trichocephalus suis and that of mice as T. muris in 1788, based on which he was the first to introduce the proper binominal name Trichocephalus hominis for the human parasite. Disagreement emerged as Karl Rudolphi renamed the human parasite as Trichocephalus dispar in 1802, and Johann Georg Heinrich Zeder made a separate genus and name Mastigodes hominines in 1803.

American parasitologists tried to resolve the confusion in the scientific name by introducing a combination of the names created by Linnaeus and Schrank, making it Trichocephalus trichiura. This became the formal name from 1901 until British parasitologist Robert Thomson Leiper revised the name to incorporate the correct identification by Roederer, giving the name Trichocephalus trichiurus and credited the authorship to Linnaeus. Ignoring the objection to the universal use of Leiper's name, the International Commission on Zoological Nomenclature adopted it, and the full name with authority became Trichocephalus trichiurus (L., 1771) Schrank, 1788. The original name "Trichuris" was rejected as it was general consensus that Roederer did not use it as a proper scientific named, creating a conflict that it could be either the genus or species name. In 1941, the Committee on Nomenclature under the American Society of Parasitologists reanalysed the whipworm taxonomy, with the conclusion:

Since the name Trichuris Roederer, 1761, clearly antedates all other technical names proposed since 1758 for the genus of the whipworms, this name should be employed, providing the requirements laid down in the International Rules of Zoological Nomenclature [sic, International Code of Zoological Nomenclature] are met by the original description.

The 16th meeting of the American Society of Parasitologists approved the conclusion and declared that "Trichuris rather than Trichocephalus is the valid generic name."

== Life cycle ==
In spite of the description of whipworms in the 18th century, the life cycle began to be understood only two centuries later. It was in the 1950s that it was established that whipworms have direct life cycle, required no other animals (vectors or intermediate hosts for their transmission) and rather fragile eggs unlike most other helminths. It is now known that all whipworm species have a similar general life cycle. Whipworm eggs are first ingested by the host. They eventually reach the duodenum of the small intestine, where the eggs ultimately hatch. The larvae from these eggs travel into the large intestine's cecum. For about four weeks, the whipworms feed on blood vessels located within the cecum. Eventually, the whipworms leave the cecum and begin to lay thousands of eggs. These unembryonated eggs are then released from the host through feces. The process from egg ingestion to release takes around 12 weeks. The released eggs become embryonated in approximately nine to twenty-one days and are eventually ingested by another host.

Whipworm eggs have thick, lemon-shaped, light yellow shells. Located on opposite ends of the shells are plugs that protect the eggs in unfavorable conditions such as rugged soil and the acidic environment of the small intestine. The actual egg is covered by a vitelline membrane. When the eggs first exit the uterus of their mother, they are composed solely of yolk granules. Over a period of 72 hours, the eggs undergo mitotic division into two blastomeres that are separated by a transverse cleavage. Two additional cleavages occur within at least 96 hours, so that the eggs are now composed of four cells each. Cellular division continues in this manner and the morula stage is reached within the next week. After a total of 21–22 days, the larvae become fully developed and will not hatch until ingested by a host. The larvae can live for a total of six months without the assistance of a host. The timeline of egg development can vary depending on the species.

== In domestic animals ==
Whipworms develop when a dog swallows whipworm eggs, passed from an infected dog. Clinical signs may include diarrhea, anemia, and dehydration. The dog whipworm (T. vulpis) is commonly found in the U.S. It is hard to detect at times, because the numbers of eggs shed are low, and they are shed in waves. Centrifugation is the preferred method. Several preventives are available by prescription from a veterinarian to prevent dogs from getting whipworm.

The cat whipworm is a rare parasite. In Europe, it is mostly represented by T. campanula, and in North America it is more often T. serrata. Whipworm eggs found in cats in North America must be differentiated from lungworms, and from mouse whipworm eggs that are just passing through.

T. campanula can be found in cats throughout the United States, having a whip-like shape, living in the large intestine and cecum of cats. The cat gets infected with T. campanula by ingesting food or water that is contaminated with the whipworm eggs. Once the cat ingests the infected eggs, they hatch and the larvae mature as adults in the large intestine, where they feed on the blood from the intestinal wall. T. campanula lays eggs that are passed in the feces of the infected cat, remaining alive in soil for years. The infection can be found by examining the feces of the infected cat. Also, blood can be found in the feces that can help in diagnosing of the infected cat. For prevention, cats should visit the veterinarian to get worming, having the feces inspected.
