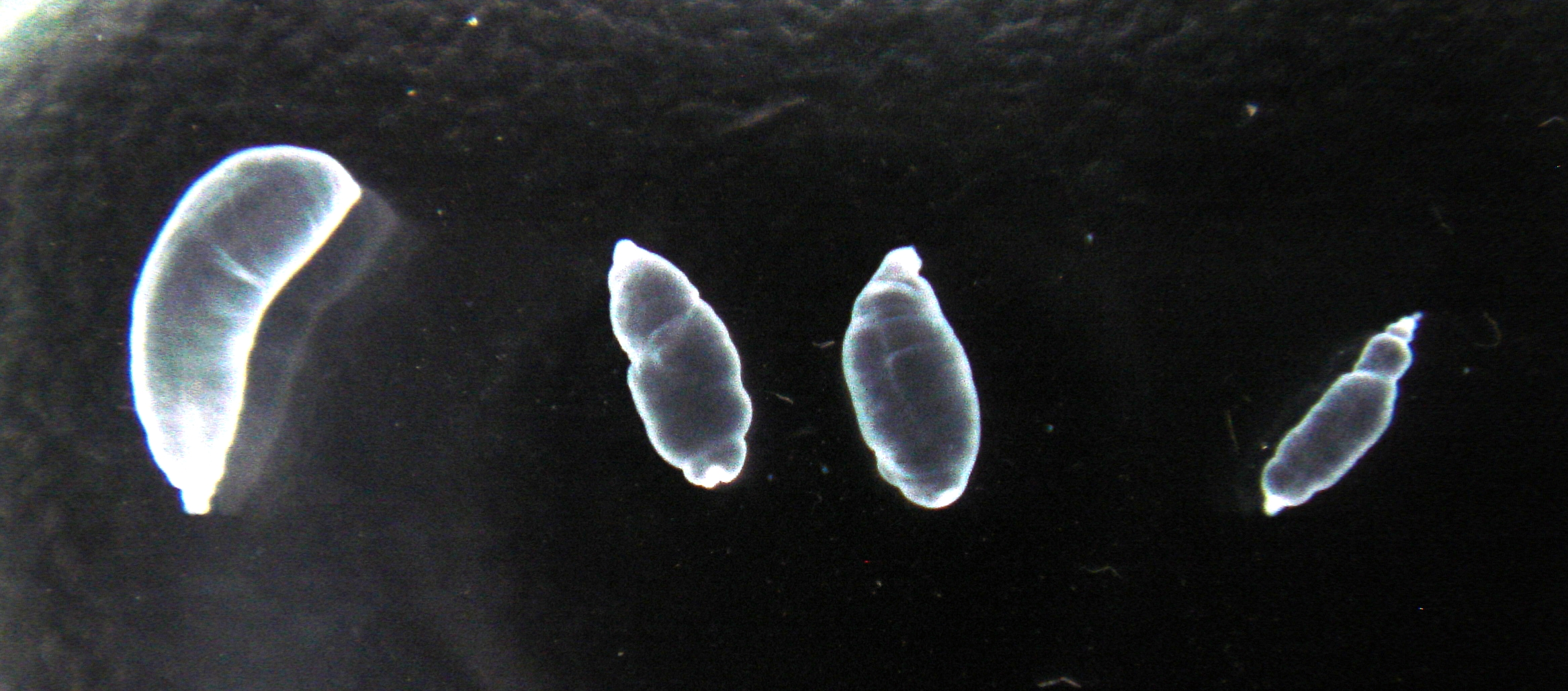
- Taenia crassiceps larvae

Scientific classification
- Kingdom: Animalia
- Phylum: Platyhelminthes
- Class: Cestoda
- Order: Cyclophyllidea
- Family: Taeniidae
- Genus: Taenia
- Species: T. crassiceps

Binomial name
- Taenia crassiceps (Zeder, 1800)

= Taenia crassiceps =

Species of Cestoda

Taenia crassiceps is a tapeworm in the family Taeniidae. It is a parasitic organism whose adult form infects the intestine of carnivores, like canids. It is related to Taenia solium, the pork tapeworm, and to Taenia saginata, the beef tapeworm. It is commonly found in the Northern Hemisphere, especially throughout Canada and the northern United States.

Natural intermediate hosts of this organism are usually small rodents and moles. The larval stages of T. crassiceps develop subcutaneously or in their body cavities as cysticerci which are cyst-like structures.

Taenia crassiceps begins its life in the intestines of wild canines, such as the wolf. Inside the wolf, the tapeworm reproduces. Its eggs are passed in the wolf's feces and are eaten by a rat. When the rat is eaten by another wolf, the parasite's life cycle repeats. Taenia crassiceps rarely infect humans, but if they do, they often cause ocular larva migrans that can progress to blindness. An adult human's immune system typically removes the parasite before permanent damage is done, however, juveniles are typically less defended.

== Human pathologies ==
Taenia crassiceps is described as an opportunistic infection in severe immunodeficiency, as in AIDS. But human infection are rare, with only eight cases reported and individuals who were infected tended to be immunosuppressed patients where parasites accumulated on skeletal muscles and subcutaneous tissue, and some with intraocular infections. Rodents are natural intermediate hosts, and they harbor the cyst-like larvae (metacestodes, cysticerci) in the peritoneal cavity, where they multiply by asexual budding. Humans serve as intermediate hosts when food or water contaminated with feces from infected canids or felids is consumed.

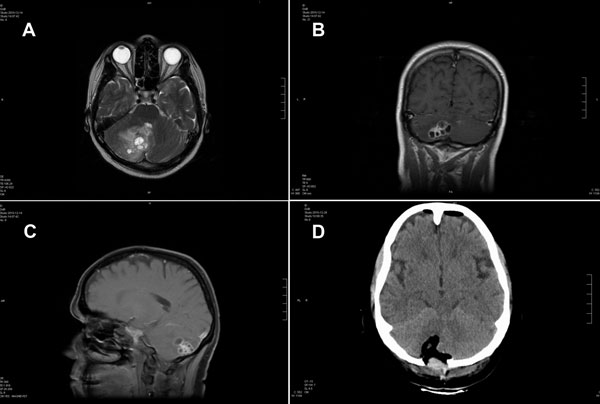
Cranial MRI of the German woman as described. A- Transverse view, T1-weighted MR image. The 30 × 30 mm parasitic lesion with perifocal edema is located in the right hemisphere of the cerebellum and caused ataxia, headache, and nausea. The fourth ventricle is compressed. B- Coronal view, T2-weighted MR image. The cyst-like appearance of the parasitic tissue is clearly visible. This lesion can be misinterpreted as cerebral echinococcosis, racemose cysticercosis caused by a Taenia solium tapeworm, or coenurosis. C- Sagittal view, MR image with contrast enhancing agent. D- Transverse view, computed tomographic image after surgery.

A case of intracranial T. crassiceps tapeworm cysticercosis with severe involvement of the cerebellum is described. A 51-year-old German woman was hospitalized because of progressive headache, nausea, and vomiting. The signs and symptoms had started two weeks before, and intensity had been increasing ever since. At the time of admission, the patient showed cerebellar ataxia but no further neurologic deficits. She did not have fever or other symptoms. She had no known chronic preconditions or recent hospital stays and had never taken immunosuppressant drugs. She had no family history of neurologic symptoms or malignant diseases. Combined surgical removal of the larvae and treatment with albendazole and praziquantel led to a complete cure in this nonimmunocompromised patient. The organism was unequivocally identified by molecular methods, thus avoiding a misdiagnosis of Taenia solium tapeworm cysticercosis.

== Symptoms ==
There may be no symptoms. Symptoms may include headaches, nausea, and vomiting.

== Laboratory studies ==
Positive test results from a serum enzyme-linked immunosorbent assay ELISA for anticysticercal antibodies help confirm the diagnosis; however, negative test results do not exclude cysticercosis. A CBC count may reveal eosinophilia.

== Treatments ==
Surgical removal is mandatory for individuals with intraocular cysts. Corticosteroids administered perioperatively may help reduce inflammation associated with uveitis. Extraocular cysticercosis can be effectively treated with antihelminthics such as albendazole or praziquantel and oral corticosteroids.

== Immunoregulation ==
The immune response elicited by T. crassiceps and its antigens in human and mice cells was studied, suggesting that it had a strong capacity to induce chronic Th2-type responses that are primarily characterized by high levels of Th2 cytokines, low proliferative response in lymphocytic cells, immature and LPS-tolerogenic profile in dendritic cells, the recruitment of myeloid-derived suppressor cells, and activated macrophages.
