= Embryonated =

Embryonated, unembryonated and de-embryonated are terms generally used in reference to eggs or, in botany, to seeds. The words are often used as professional jargon rather than as universally applicable terms or concepts. Examples of relevant fields in which the words are useful include reproductive biology, virology, microbiology, parasitology, entomology, and poultry husbandry. Since the words are widely used in the various disciplines, there seems to be little present prospect of replacing them with universal, definitive, and distinct terms.

== Meaning ==
The terms embryonated, unembryonated and de-embryonated respectively mean "having an embryo", "not having an embryo", and "having lost an embryo", and they most often refer to eggs. In Merriam-Webster the earliest known use of the term "embryonated" dates from 1687, while Oxford gives a reference dating from 1669.

=== Embryonate ===
The term embryonate can be used as an adjective to mean embryonated, or as a noun to mean one containing an embryo (e.g. "We selected only the embryonates and discarded the rest").

Embryonate can also be used as an intransitive verb meaning to develop an embryo (e.g. "In 2-4 weeks after deposition in soil, they embryonate if the soil conditions are suitable").

=== De-embryonate ===
De-embryonate refers to the removal of embryos from seeds or similar reproductive units, typically in physiological studies. As with embrionate, it can either be a verb, noun or adjective. In some contexts the term "embryonectomy" may be used. For example, loss of the embryo may result from the activity of seed predation by insects.

== Usage ==
There often is confusion in applying the term to various classes of unfertilised eggs and trophic eggs, depending on the area of expertise.

=== Virology ===
In virology, eggs of domestic poultry are used for culturing viruses for research purposes. Viruses generally can propagate only in live cells, so only a fertilised egg with a good supply of growing embryonic tissue is useful. Practitioners call such an egg embryonated, as opposed to merely fertilised, because they're referring to an advanced stage of development, not merely after fertilisation.

=== Entomology ===
In entomology, an egg sometimes is called unembryonated until it contains a visibly segmented embryo. An unembryonated egg might be a trophic egg, probably (but not necessarily) unfertilised or at least infertile. Such an egg will not contain a viable zygote. Alternatively, "unembryonated" might refer to an egg that is "immature", not yet well into the process of development. These are likely to take a long time to hatch, as opposed to eggs that are laid partly incubated and ready to hatch soon after, or even at the time of oviposition.

"Unembryonated" can also describe an empty shell, such as a nit, the egg of a louse that has already hatched or has died. However, this usage is rarely described. Burgess (1995) states: "We have...come to reserve the term "nit" for the hatched and empty egg shell and refer to the developing embryonated egg as an "egg"".

=== Helminthology ===
In helminthology, the state of development of an egg is often relevant to particular phases of the life cycle; commonly the visible presence of an embryo is an important criterion for egg "maturity". Use of this definition of embryonated is common in certain scientific literature. For example: "...Immature eggs are discharged in the biliary ducts and in the stool. Eggs become embryonated in water".
