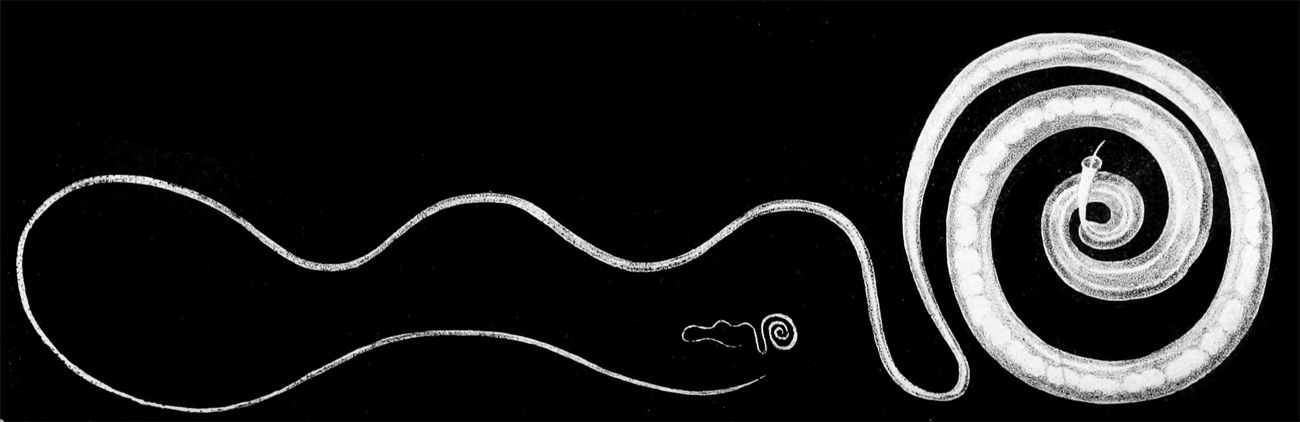
- Male
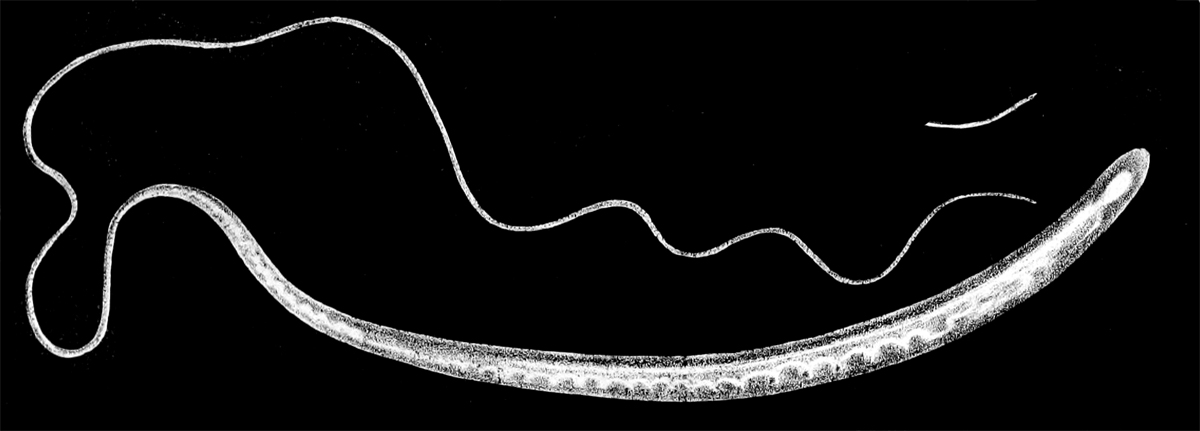
- Female

Scientific classification
- Kingdom: Animalia
- Phylum: Nematoda
- Class: Enoplea
- Order: Trichocephalida
- Family: Trichuridae
- Genus: Trichuris
- Species: T. trichiura

Binomial name
- Trichuris trichiura (Linnaeus, 1771)

Synonyms
- Ascaris trichiura Linnaeus, 1771

= Trichuris trichiura =

Whipworm(s)

Parasitic roundworm that causes intestinal infection

Trichuris trichiura or whipworm, is a parasitic roundworm (a type of helminth) that causes trichuriasis (a type of helminthiasis which is one of the neglected tropical diseases) when it infects a human large intestine. It is commonly known as the whipworm which refers to the shape of the worm; it looks like a whip with wider "handles" at the posterior end. The helminth is also known to cause rectal prolapse.

== Life cycle ==
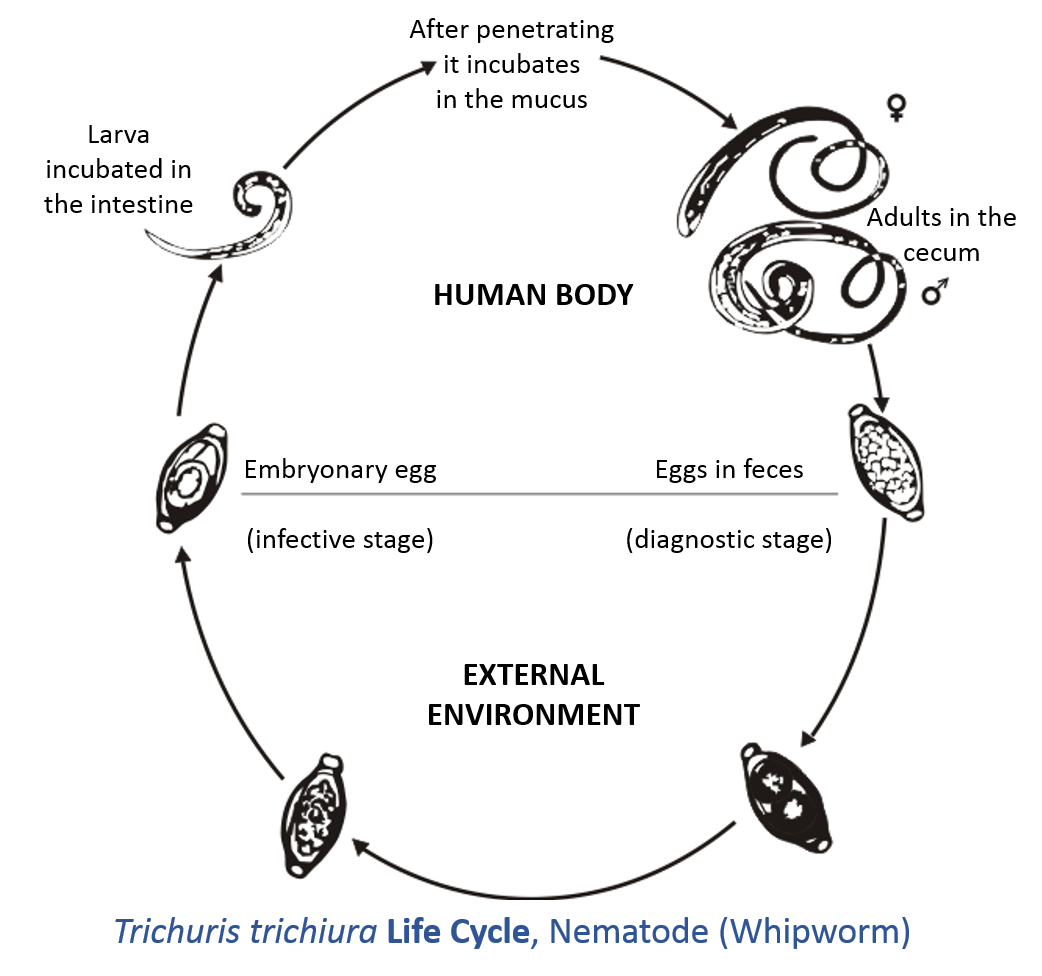
Life cycle of Trichuris trichiura inside and outside the human body

The female T. trichiura produces 2,000–10,000 single-celled eggs per day. Eggs are deposited from human feces to soil where, after two to three weeks, they become embryonated and enter the "infective" stage. These embryonated infective eggs are ingested by hand-mouth or through fomites and hatch in the human small intestine, exploiting the intestinal microflora as a stimulus to hatching. This is the location of growth and molting. The infective larvae penetrate the villi and continue to develop in the small intestine. The young worms move to the caecum and penetrate the mucosa, and there they complete development as adult worms in the large intestine. The life cycle from the time of ingestion of eggs to the development of mature worms takes approximately three months. During this time, there may be limited signs of infection in stool samples, due to a lack of egg production and shedding. The female T. trichiura begin to lay eggs after three months of maturity. Worms commonly live for about one year, during which time females can lay up to 20,000 eggs per day.

Recent studies using genome-wide scanning revealed that two quantitative trait loci on chromosome 9 and chromosome 18 may be responsible for a genetic predisposition or susceptibility to infection of T. trichiura by some individuals.

== Morphology ==
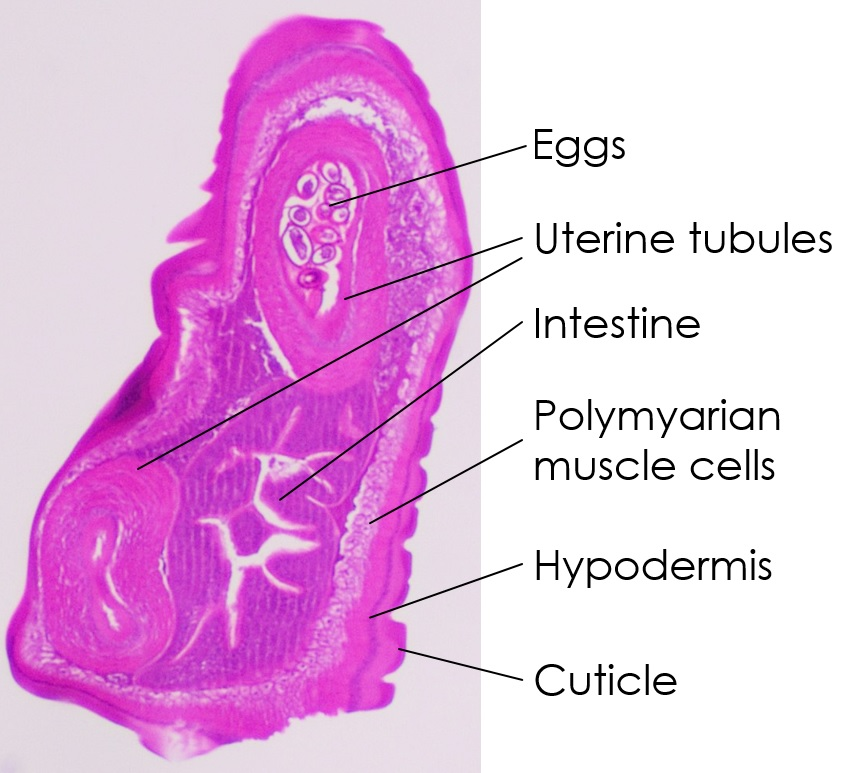
Cross-section of whipworm on microscopy

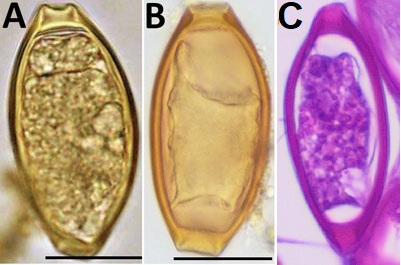
Eggs of Trichuris trichura. Image C shows HE stain.

Trichuris trichiura has a narrow anterior esophageal end and shorter and thicker posterior end. These pinkish-white worms are threaded through the mucosa. They attach to the host through their slender anterior end and feed on tissue secretions instead of blood. Females are larger than males; approximately 35–50 mm long compared to 30–45 mm. The females have a bluntly round posterior end compared to their male counterparts with a coiled posterior end. Their characteristic eggs are barrel-shaped and brown, and have bipolar protuberances.

== Infection ==
Trichuriasis, also known as whipworm infection, occurs through ingestion of whipworm eggs and is more common in warmer climates. Whipworm eggs are passed in the feces of infected persons, and if an infected person defecates outdoors or if untreated human feces is used as fertilizer, eggs are deposited on soil where they can mature into an infective stage. Ingestion of these eggs "can happen when hands or fingers that have contaminated dirt on them are put in the mouth or by consuming vegetables or fruits that have not been carefully cooked, washed or peeled." The eggs hatch in the small intestine, then move into the wall of the small intestine and develop. On reaching adulthood, the thinner end (the anterior of the worm) burrows into the large intestine, the thicker (posterior) end projecting into the lumen, where it mates with nearby worms. The females can grow to 50 mm (2.0 in) long.

Trichuris trichiura can cause the serious disease Trichuris dysentery syndrome (TDS), with chronic dysentery, anemia, rectal prolapse, and poor growth. TDS is treated with anthelminthics as well as iron supplementation for anemia.

Whipworm commonly infects patients also infected with Giardia, Entamoeba histolytica, Ascaris lumbricoides, and hookworms.

=== Treatment ===
Trichuris trichiura can be treated with a single dose of albendazole. Another treatment that can be used is mebendazole or flubendazole. For higher cure rate, these anthelmintic agents can be combined with other medications such as ivermectin or moxidectin. The medication interferes with the parasite's nutrient intake, which eventually leads to death.

=== Epidemiology ===
There is a worldwide distribution of Trichuris trichiura, with an estimated one billion human infections. However, it is chiefly tropical, especially in Asia and, to a lesser degree, in Africa and South America. Within the United States, infection is rare. Poor hygiene is associated with trichuriasis as well as the consumption of shaded moist soil, or food that may have been fecally contaminated. Children are especially vulnerable to infection due to their high exposure risk. Eggs are infective about 2–3 weeks after they are deposited in the soil under proper conditions of warmth and moisture, hence its tropical distribution.

A closely related species, Trichuris suis, which typically infects pigs, is capable of infecting humans. This shows that the two species have very close evolutionary histories. However, morphology and developmental stages remain different, making them two separate species.

WHO have since 2001 had a strategy for control of soil-transmitted helminths, including whipworms. This strategy entails treating at-risk individuals in the endemic areas. Risk groups for whipworm infections are children at preschool and school-aged children, people with specific high-risk jobs, women in reproductive and pregnant and breastfeeding women. The periodic treatment of the risk groups is done through either deworming campaigns or preventative chemotherapy.

== Treatment of inflammatory disorders ==
The hygiene hypothesis suggests that various immunological disorders that have been observed in humans only within the last 100 years, such as Crohn's disease, or that have become more common during that period as hygienic practices have become more widespread, may result from a lack of exposure to parasitic worms (helminths) during childhood. The use of Trichuris suis ova (TSO, or pig whipworm eggs) by Weinstock, et al., as a therapy for treating Crohn's disease and to a lesser extent ulcerative colitis are two examples that support this hypothesis. There is also anecdotal evidence that treatment of inflammatory bowel disease (IBD) with TSO decreases the incidence of asthma, allergy, and other inflammatory disorders. Some scientific evidence suggests that the course of multiple sclerosis may be very favorably altered by helminth infection; TSO is being studied as a treatment for this disease.

== See also ==
- Defecography
