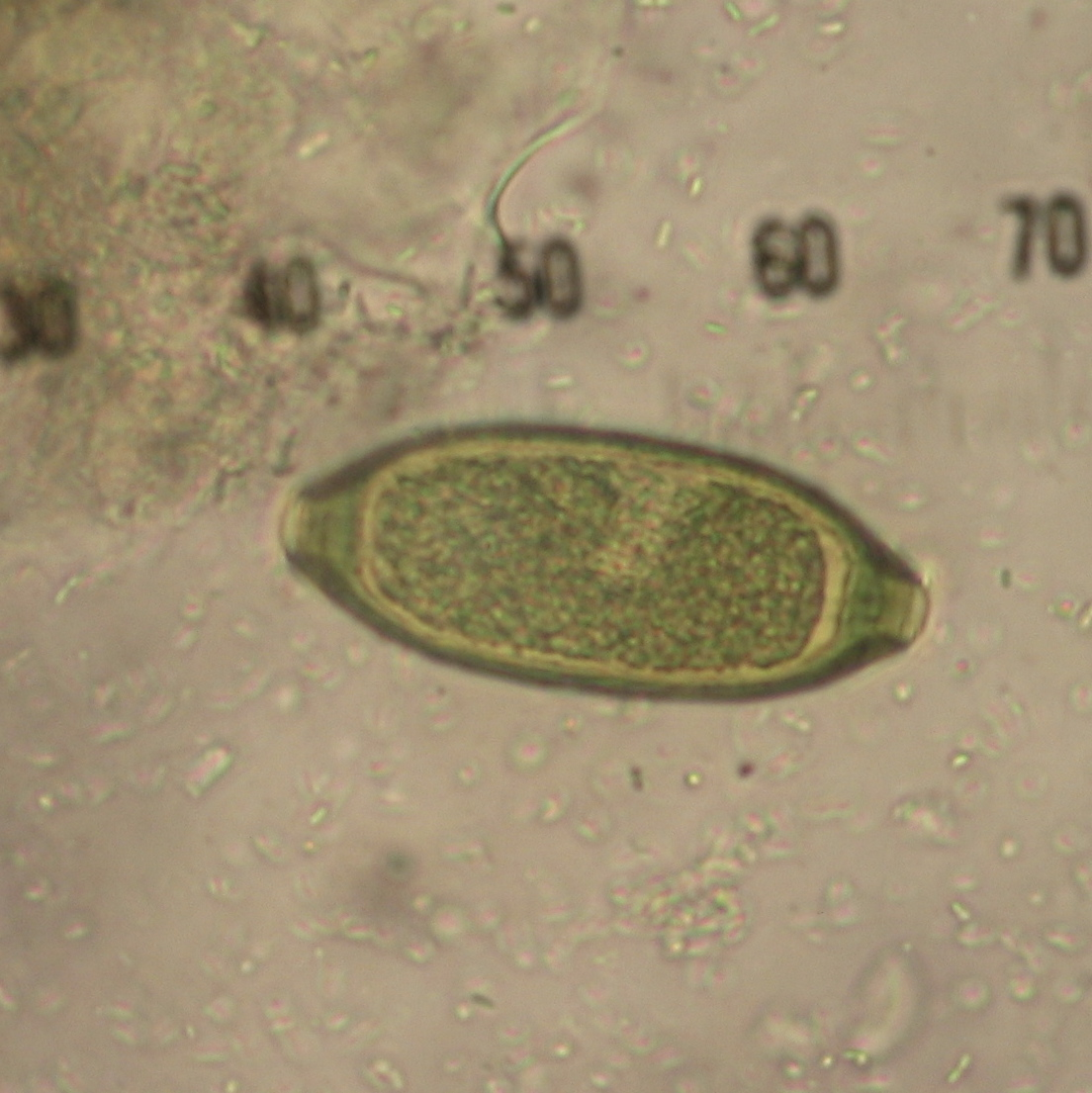
- Trichuris egg in stool sample (40x)

Scientific classification
- Kingdom: Animalia
- Phylum: Nematoda
- Class: Enoplea
- Order: Trichocephalida
- Family: Trichuridae; Ransom, 1911

Genera
- 6, see text

= Trichuridae =

Family of roundworms

The roundworm family Trichuridae includes the type genus Trichuris and some less widely known members. They are (after the abolishment of the artificial "Adenophorea" assemblage) placed in subclass Dorylaimia of the class Enoplea; however, the former might be better treated as a class in its own right. That nonwithstanding, their order (Trichocephalida) has been known under alternate names in the past, namely Trichiurida.

The genus Trichuris is particularly well known for being a common parasite of domestic animals and less usually humans. Its common name "whipworm" refers to the shape of these worms; they look like whips with wider "handles" at the posterior end.

The genera of Trichuridae are:

- Capillostrongyloides Freitas & Lent, 1935
- Orthothominx Teixeira de Freitas & Jorge da Silva, 1960
- Pearsonema Teixeira de Freitas & Machado de Mendonça, 1960
- Sclerotrichum Rudolphi, 1819
- Tenoranema Mas-Coma & Esteban, 1985
- Trichuris Roederer, 1761

Some authors consider Capillarinae to be a subfamily of Trichuridae.
