= Chabertia =

Chabertia may refer to:

- Chabertia (plant), a genus of plants in the family Rosaceae
- Chabertia (nematode), a genus of parasitic roundworms in the family Chabertiidae
