= Cloacina elegans =

Scientific classification
- Domain: Eukaryota
- Kingdom: Animalia
- Phylum: Nematoda
- Class: Chromadorea
- Order: Rhabditida
- Family: Chabertiidae
- Genus: Cloacina
- Species: C. elegans

Binomial name
- Cloacina elegans Johnston & Mawson, 1938

Species of roundworm

Cloacina elegans is a species of parasitic nematodes in the family Chabertiidae. Members of the species are parasites of marsupials in Australia.
