= Psorobia ovis =

Scientific classification
- Kingdom: Animalia
- Phylum: Arthropoda
- Subphylum: Chelicerata
- Class: Arachnida
- Order: Trombidiformes
- Family: Psorergatidae
- Genus: Psorobia
- Species: P. ovis

Binomial name
- Psorobia ovis (Womersley, 1941)

Species of mite

Psorobia ovis, the sheep itch mite, is a species of mite in the family Psorergatidae. It can cause mange in sheep.
