= List of infectious sheep and goat diseases =

Sheep and goats are both small ruminants with cosmopolitan distributions due to their being kept historically and in modern times as grazers both individually and in herds in return for their production of milk, wool, and meat. As such, the diseases of these animals are of great economic importance to humans.

== Prion diseases ==
- scrapie

== Viral diseases ==
Diseases caused by viruses include:

- Akabane virus infection
- bluetongue disease
- border disease (hairy shaker disease)
- Cache Valley virus infection
- caprine arthritis encephalitis (CAE)
- enzootic nasal adenocarcinoma
- foot-and-mouth disease
- mastitis
- Nairobi sheep disease orthonairovirus (NSDV) infection
- orf, also known as contagious ecthyma, contagious pustular dermatitis, infectious labial dermatitis, thistle disease, sore mouth, or scabby mouth
- ovine encephalomyelitis (louping ill)
- ovine progressive pneumonia (OPP)
- ovine pulmonary adenocarcinoma
- ovine rinderpest, also known as peste des petits ruminants (PPR)
- Rift Valley fever
- Schmallenberg virus infection
- ulcerative dermatosis
- variola caprina (goatpox)
- variola ovina (sheeppox)
- Wesselsbron virus infection

== Bacterial diseases ==
Diseases caused by bacteria include:

- anaplasmosis
- blackleg
- braxy
- brucellosis
- caseous lymphadenitis
- chlamydiosis, also known as enzootic abortion of ewes (EAE)
- contagious caprine pleuropneumonia
- dermatophilosis, also known as cutaneous streptothricosis, rainscald, rain rot, lumpy wool, or strawberry footrot
- ehrlichiosis
- enterotoxemia
- enzootic posthitis and vulvitis, also known as sheath rot, pizzle rot, or enzootic balanoposthitis
- foot rot
- infectious necrotic hepatitis
- lamb dysentery (Clostridium perfringens type B disease)
- leptospirosis
- listeriosis
- mastitis
- mycoplasmosis
- paratuberculosis (Johne's disease)
- pasteurellosis
- Q fever
- salmonellosis
- struck (Clostridium perfringens type C disease)
- tularemia
- ulcerative balanoposthitis and vulvitis, also known as necrotic balanoposthitis/vulvitis, pizzle disease, knobrot, or peestersiekte
- vibriosis

== Fungal diseases ==
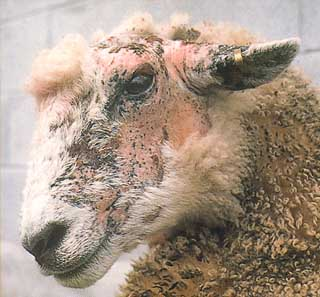
A sheep showing clinical symptoms of facial eczema.

Diseases caused by funguses include

- candidiasis
- cryptococcosis
- facial eczema
- fungal placentitis
- sporotrichosis
- zygomycosis

== Parasitic diseases ==
Parasites causing disease in sheep and goats include diseases caused by protozoa, helminths, tapeworms and roundworms.

=== Protozoa ===
- Babesia species
- Cryptosporidium parvum
- Eimeria species
- Giardia intestinalis
- Neospora caninum
- Sarcocystis species
- Theileria lestoquardi (hirsi)
- Toxoplasma gondii
- Trypanosoma species

=== Helminths ===
==== Flatworms ====
- Dicrocoelium dendriticum
- Fasciola hepatica
- Fasciola gigantica
- Fascioloides magna
- Schistosoma bovis

==== Tapeworms ====
E. granulosus life cycle

- Echinococcus granulosus
- Moniezia species
- Taenia ovis
- Taenia hydatigena

==== Roundworms ====
- Chabertia ovina
- Dictyocaulus filaria
- Elaeophora schneideri
- Haemonchus contortus
- Cooperia species
- Muellerius capillaris
- Nematodirus species
- Neostrongylus linearis
- Oesophagostomum species
- parasitic bronchitis, also known as "hoose"
- Protostrongylus refescens
- Teladorsagia circumcincta
- Trichostrongylus species
- Trichuris ovis

=== Arachnids and insects ===
==== Ticks ====
- Amblyomma species
- Boophilus species
- Dermacentor species
- Haemaphysalis species
- Hyalomma species
- Ixodes species
- Rhipicephalus species

==== Mites (mange) ====
- Chorioptes bovis
- Demodex ovis
- Demodex caprae
- Psorobia ovis
- Psoroptes ovis
- Sarcoptes scabiei var. caprae
- Sarcoptes scabiei var. ovis

==== Lice ====
- chewing lice
  - Damalinia caprae (goats)
  - Damalinia crassipes (goats)
  - Damalinia limbata (goats)
  - Damalinia ovis (sheep)
- sucking lice
  - Linognathus africanus (sheep and goats)
  - Linognathus ovillus (sheep)
  - Linognathus pedalis (sheep)
  - Linognathus stenopsis (Gots

)

==== Flies ====
- mosquitoes
  - Aedes species
  - Anopheles species
  - Culex species
- myiasis
  - fly strike
    - Chrysomya species
    - Lucilia species
  - Oestrus ovis (sheep bot fly)
- sheep ked (Melophagus ovinus)
