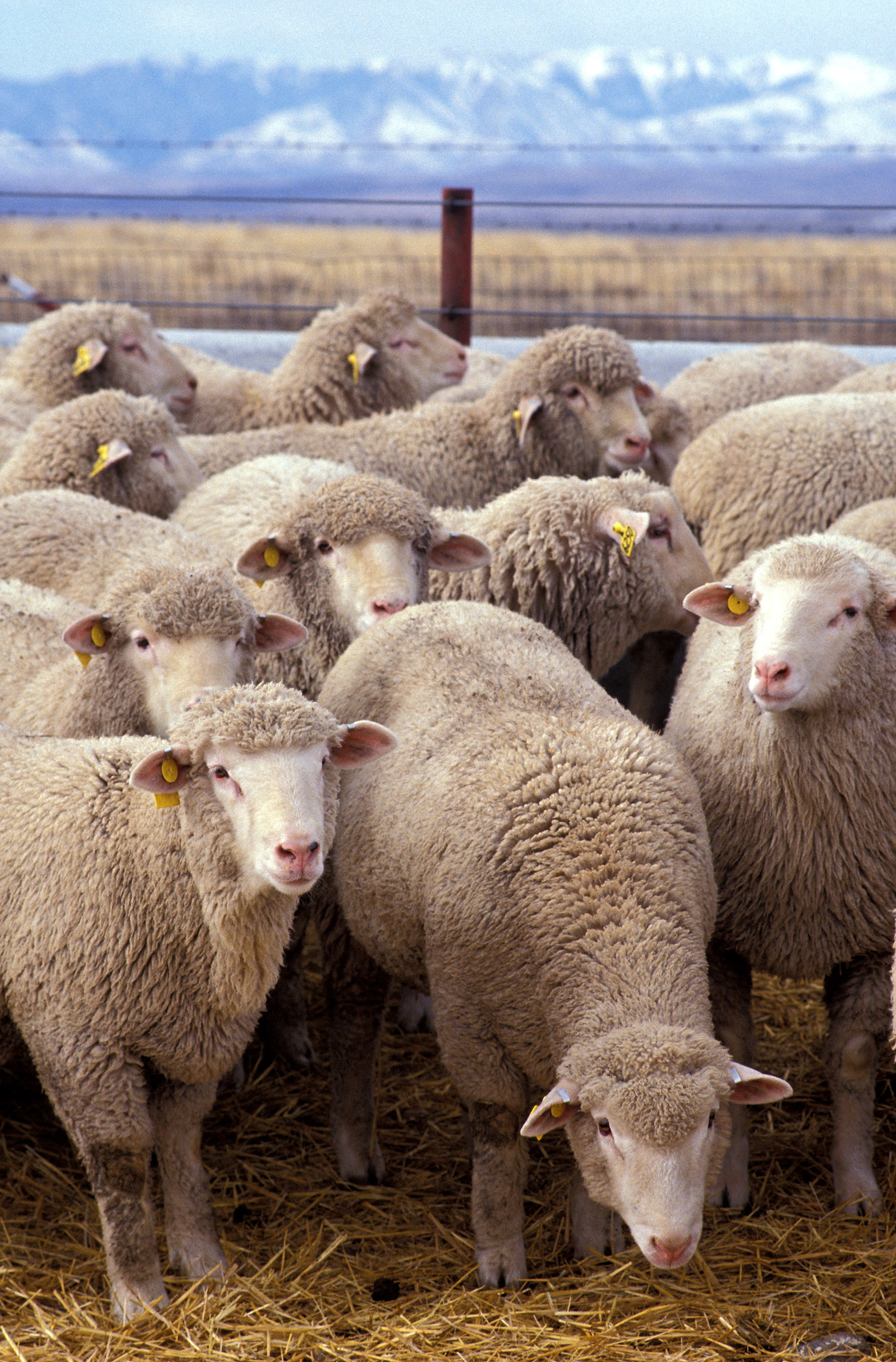

Conservation status
- Domesticated

Scientific classification
- Kingdom: Animalia
- Phylum: Chordata
- Class: Mammalia
- Order: Artiodactyla
- Family: Bovidae
- Subfamily: Caprinae
- Genus: Ovis
- Species: O. aries

Binomial name
- Ovis aries Linnaeus (1758)

Synonyms
- Ovis guineensis Linnaeus, 1758; Ovis strepsiceros Linnaeus, 1758

Audio
- Calls

= Sheep =

Sheep Temporal range: 0.01–0 Ma Early Holocene (Pleistocene-Holocene boundary) to present (10,000 years ago)

Species of domesticated mammal

Sheep (pl.: sheep) or domestic sheep (Ovis aries) are a domesticated ruminant mammal typically kept as livestock. Although the term sheep can apply to other species in the genus Ovis, in everyday usage it almost always refers to domesticated sheep. Like all ruminants, sheep are members of the order Artiodactyla, the even-toed ungulates. There are around 1.3 billion domestic sheep as of 2021, making them easily the most common species of sheep. An adult female is referred to as a ewe (/juː/ yoo); an intact male as a ram, occasionally a tup; a castrated male as a wether; and a young sheep as a lamb.

Sheep are most likely descended from the wild mouflon of western Asia, probably from populations in present-day Turkey and Iran. One of the earliest animals to be domesticated for agricultural purposes, sheep are raised for fleeces, meat (lamb, hogget, or mutton), and sheep milk. A sheep's wool is the most widely used animal fiber, and is usually harvested by shearing. Ovine meat is called lamb and mutton, with lamb describing meat from younger animals and mutton meat from older ones. Sheep continue to be important for wool and meat today, and are also occasionally raised for pelts, as dairy animals, or as model organisms for science.

Sheep husbandry is done throughout the majority of the inhabited world. It was central to agriculture and textiles throughout Eurasia for millennia. In the 21st century, Australia, New Zealand, nations of southern and western South America, South Africa, and the British Isles are most closely associated with sheep production. More recently, China and India host among the largest flocks by absolute count, if as a smaller proportion of their economy.

As a key animal in the history of farming, sheep have an entrenched place in human culture. Sheep terminology and idiom are common in language and symbolism. As livestock, sheep are most often associated with pastoral, Arcadian imagery. Sheep figure in many mythologies—such as the Golden Fleece—and major religions, especially the Abrahamic traditions. In both ancient and modern religious ritual, sheep are used as sacrificial animals.

== History ==
The exact line of descent from wild ancestors to domestic sheep is unclear. The most common hypothesis states that Ovis aries is descended from the Asiatic (O. gmelini) species of mouflon; the European mouflon (Ovis aries musimon) is a feral descendant of early domestic sheep. The urial (O. vignei), once also proposed as an ancestor, is now classed as a separate species from the mouflon and has been ruled out by mitochondrial DNA studies. Sheep were among the earliest animals to be domesticated by humankind (along with dogs, which were domesticated 10 to 20 thousand years earlier); the date of domestication is estimated to fall between about 9000 and 8500 BC, in the region from the northern Zagros Mountains to southeastern Anatolia, from which it spread to Mehrgarh in the Indus Valley around 7000 BC. The rearing of sheep for secondary products, and the resulting breed development, began in either southwest Asia or western Europe. Initially, sheep were kept for meat, milk, and skins rather than fleece. Archaeological evidence from statuary found at sites in Iran suggests that selection for woolly sheep may have begun around 6000 BC, while the earliest woven wool garments have been dated to around 4000 BC, two thousand years later.

Sheep husbandry spread quickly in Europe; early Neolithic farmers had brought sheep to Greece by around 7000 BC. By 4000 BC, sheep reached as far west as Britain and as far east as China. By around 3000 BC, sheep had been selectively bred to favor white fleece (easier to dye) and to not molt. The Ancient Greek civilization relied on sheep as primary livestock. Ancient Romans kept sheep on a wide scale, and were an important agent in the spread of sheep raising. Pliny the Elder, in his Natural History (Naturalis Historia), speaks at length about sheep and wool.

In medieval England, the Domesday Book says sheep outnumbered all other livestock combined, and wool was a key export. European colonists spread the practice of sheep husbandry to the New World from 1493 onwards. Spain's prized breed of Merino sheep made it a major wool exporter in the early modern period; Australia and New Zealand became major sources of wool export in the 19th century as well.

=== Etymology and terminology ===
Use of the word sheep began in Middle English as a derivation of the Old English word scēap. A group of sheep is called a flock. Many other specific terms for the various life stages of sheep exist, generally related to lambing, shearing, and age.

The domestic sheep was given its scientific name, Ovis aries, by Carl Linnaeus in the 1758 edition of his Systema Naturae. Linnaeus was not familiar with wild ancestors of the sheep, and named only the domestic form.

== Characteristics ==
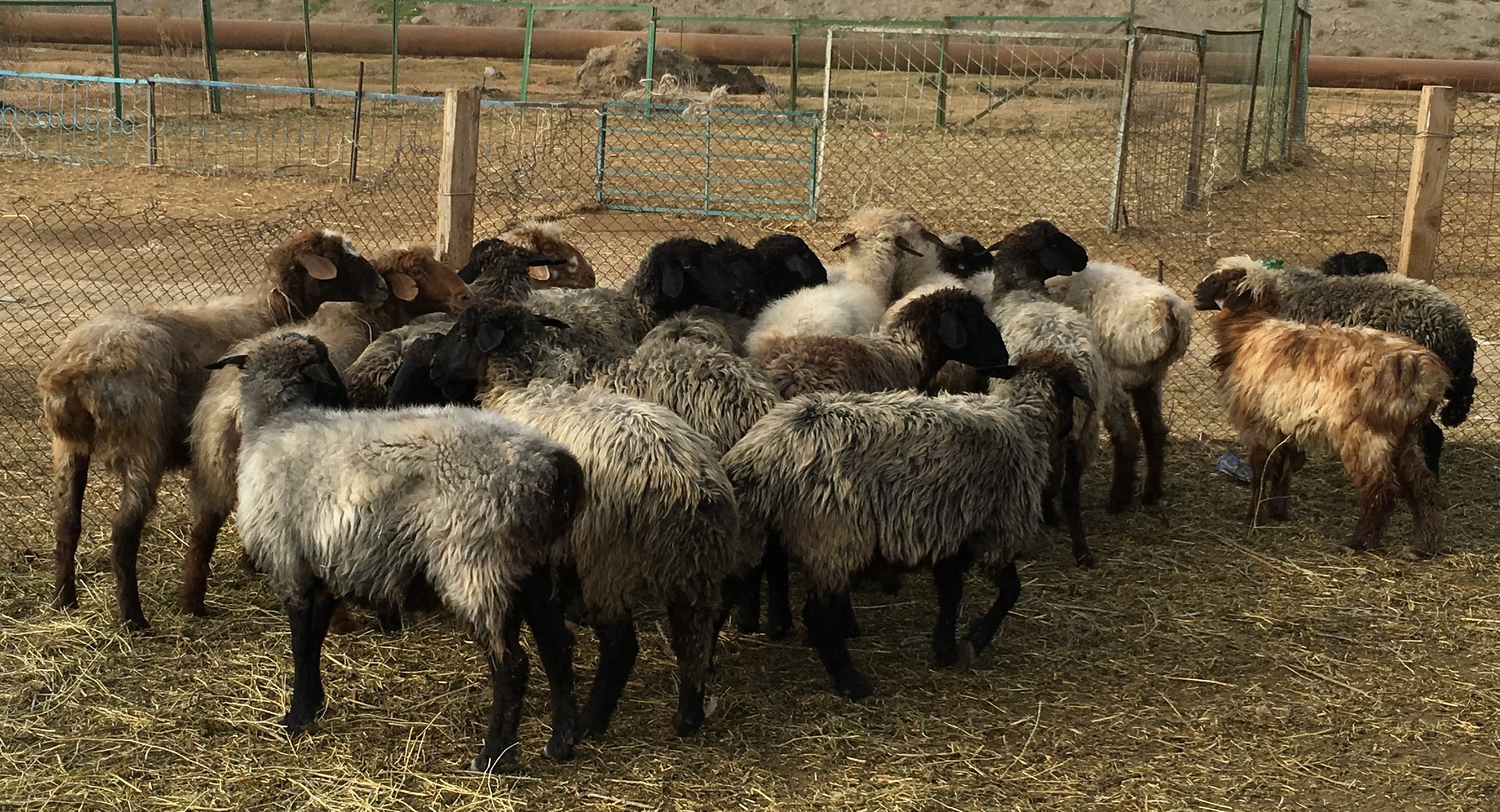
Sheep in Turkmenistan

Domestic sheep are relatively small ruminants, usually with a crimped hair called wool and often with horns forming a lateral spiral. They differ from their wild relatives and ancestors in several respects, having become neotenic as a result of selective breeding by humans. A few primitive breeds of sheep retain some of the characteristics of their wild cousins, such as short tails. Depending on breed, domestic sheep may have no horns at all (i.e. polled), or horns in both sexes, or in males only. Most horned breeds have a single pair, but a few breeds may have several horns, such as Jacob sheep.

Depending on breed, sheep show a range of heights and weights. Their rate of growth and mature weight is a heritable trait that is often selected for in breeding. Mature weight varies with breed and nutrition; ewes range from 45–90 pounds (20–41 kg) in the Soay to 170–250 pounds (77–113 kg) in the Suffolk. Mature rams are heavier, although this is influenced by handlers favoring larger rams for a role as breeding sire and giving them better feed; these rams are typically 50 to 60 percent heavier than ewes. (Note: Selected rams may weigh nearly twice as much as the average ewe of their breed. Some breeds are far smaller than commercial sheep: ewes of the Jaffna sheep of Sri Lanka weigh only 18 kilograms (40 lb), and rams 23 kilograms (51 lb).)

=== Coat ===
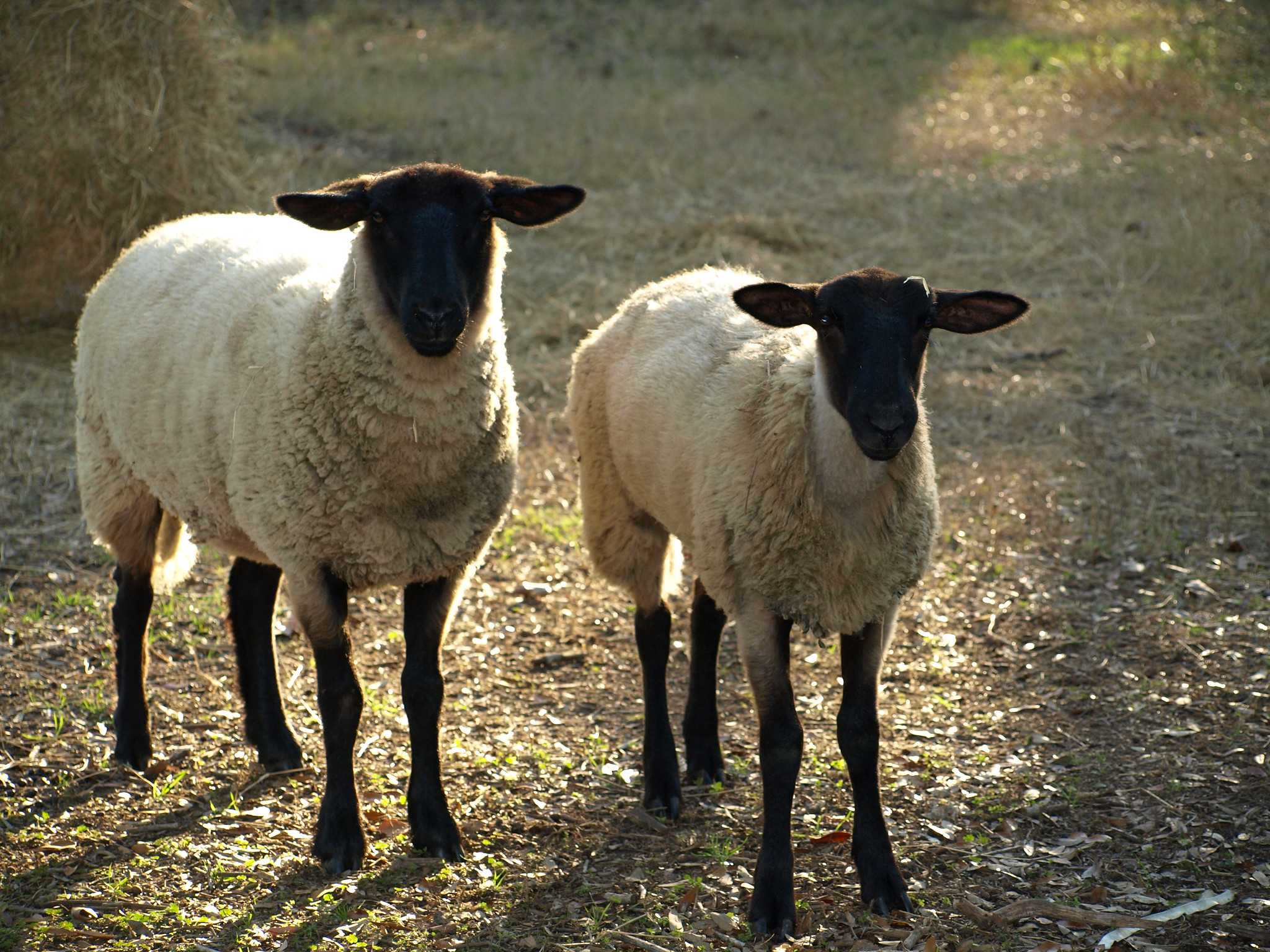
Suffolks are a medium wool, black-faced breed of meat sheep that make up 50% of the purebred sheep population in the U.S.

Unlike wild ovines, domestic sheep vary widely in color. Wild sheep are largely variations of brown hues, and variation within species is extremely limited. Colors of domestic sheep range from pure white to dark chocolate brown, and even spotted or piebald. Sheep keepers also sometimes artificially paint "smit marks" onto their sheep in any pattern or color for identification. Selection for easily dyeable white fleeces began early in sheep domestication, and as white wool is a dominant trait it spread quickly. However, colored sheep do appear in many modern breeds, and may even appear as a recessive trait in white flocks. While white wool is desirable for large commercial markets, there is a niche market for colored fleeces, mostly for handspinning. The nature of the fleece varies widely among the breeds, from dense and highly crimped, to long and hairlike. There is variation of wool type and quality even among members of the same flock, so wool classing is a step in the commercial processing of the fiber.

=== Teeth and lifespan ===
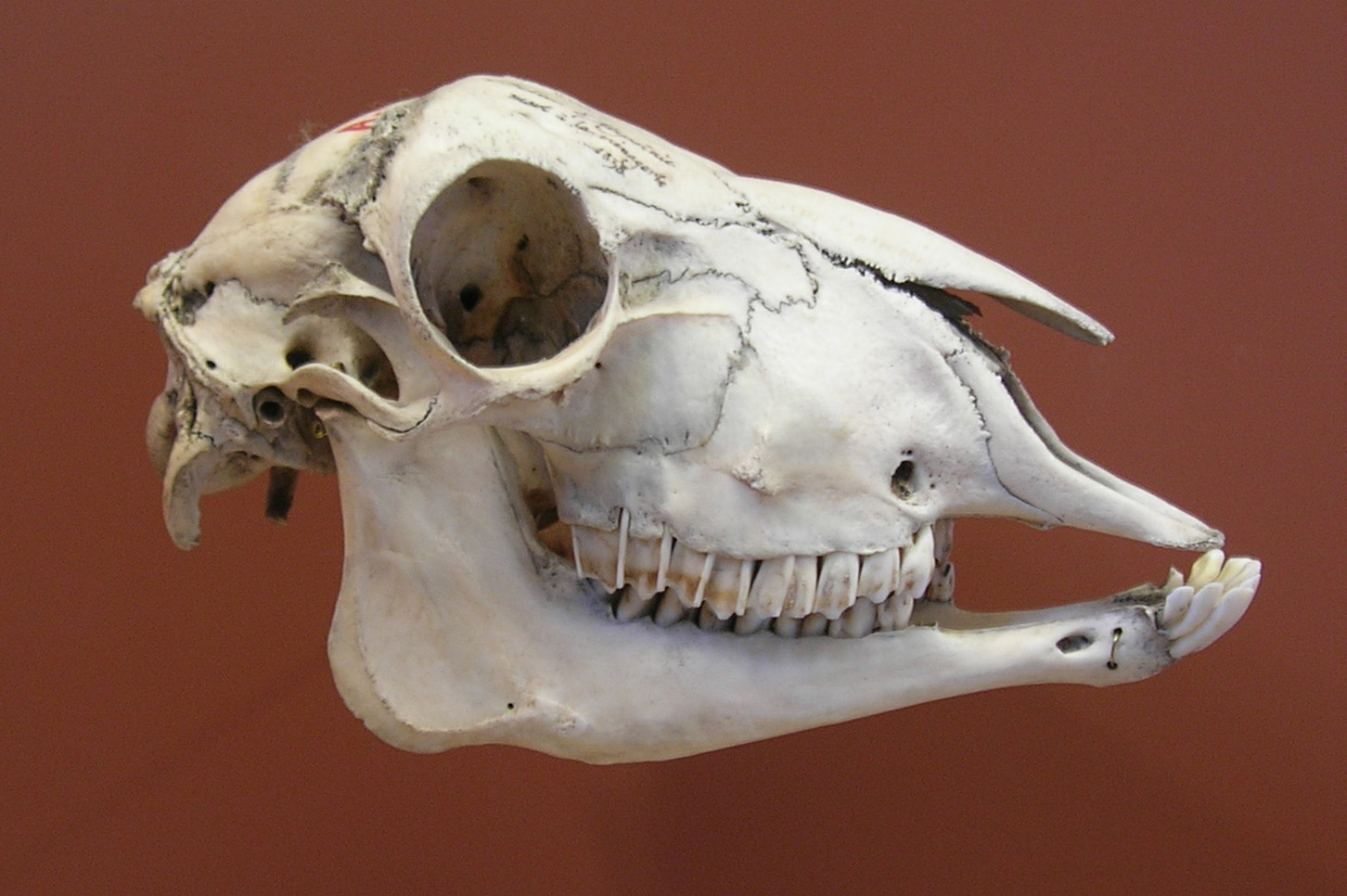
Skull

When all deciduous teeth have erupted, the sheep has 20 teeth. Mature sheep have 32 teeth. As with other ruminants, the front teeth in the lower jaw bite against a hard, toothless dental pad in the upper jaw. These are used to pick off vegetation, then the rear teeth grind it before it is swallowed. There are eight lower front teeth in ruminants, but there is some disagreement as to whether these are eight incisors, or six incisors and two incisor-shaped canines. This means that the dental formula for sheep is either 0.0.3.34.0.3.3 or 0.0.3.33.1.3.3 There is a large diastema between the incisors and the molars.

In the first few years of life one can calculate the age of sheep from their front teeth, as a first and second set of milk teeth are replaced by larger adult teeth. The full set of eight adult front teeth is complete at about four years of age. These teeth are then gradually ground down as sheep age and feed on pasture, making it harder for them to feed and hindering their health over time. For this reason, domestic sheep on normal pasture begin to slowly decline from four years on. The life expectancy of a sheep is 10 to 12 years, though some sheep may live as long as 20 years. Ranchers often consider culling sheep not raised for meat around 6 years of age, although extra pasture or the sheep being an exceptional producer can encourage their handlers to continue keeping them.

=== Senses ===
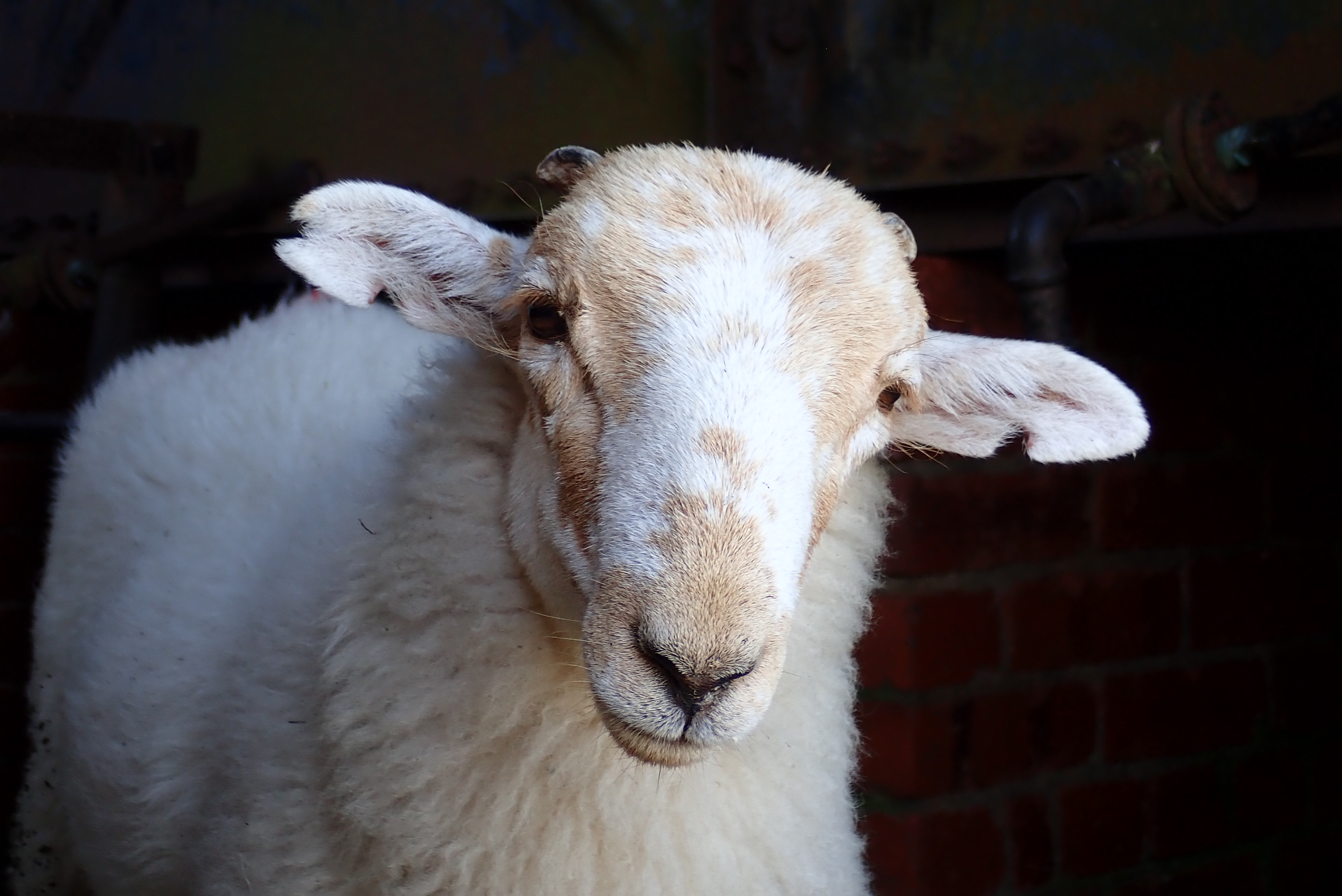
A Welsh Mountain sheep

Sheep have good hearing, and are sensitive to noise. Sheep have horizontal slit-shaped pupils, with excellent peripheral vision; they can see behind themselves without turning their heads. In sheep breeds lacking facial wool, the visual field is wide. In 10 sheep (Cambridge, Lleyn and Welsh Mountain breeds, which lack facial wool), the visual field ranged from 298° to 325°, averaging 313.1°, with binocular overlap ranging from 44.5° to 74°, averaging 61.7°. A few breeds tend to have considerable wool on the face; for some individuals of these breeds, peripheral vision may be greatly reduced by "wool blindness", unless recently shorn about the face. In 60 Merinos, visual fields ranged from 219.1° to 303.0°, averaging 269.9°, and the binocular field ranged from 8.9° to 77.7°, averaging 47.5°; 36% of the measurements were limited by wool, although photographs of the experiments indicate that only limited facial wool regrowth had occurred since shearing. In addition to facial wool (in some breeds), visual field limitations can include ears and (in some breeds) horns, so the visual field can be extended by tilting the head.

Sheep eyes exhibit very low hyperopia and little astigmatism. Such visual characteristics are likely to produce a well-focused retinal image of objects in both the middle and long distance. Because sheep eyes have no accommodation, one might expect the image of very near objects to be blurred, but a rather clear near image could be provided by the tapetum and large retinal image of the sheep's eye, and adequate close vision may occur at muzzle length. Sheep have good depth perception within the narrow field seen by both eyes directly in front of them, as confirmed in "visual cliff" experiments. Sheep are thought to have color vision, and can distinguish between a variety of colors: black, red, brown, green, yellow, and white. Sheep tend to balk at shadows on the ground, sharp contrasts between light and dark, and places they cannot see into, and move more readily into well-lit areas.

Taste is the most important sense in sheep, establishing forage preferences, with sweet and sour plants being preferred and bitter plants being more commonly rejected. Touch and sight are also important in relation to specific plant characteristics, such as succulence and growth form. Sheep also have an excellent sense of smell, and, like all species of their genus, have scent glands just in front of the eyes, and interdigitally on the feet. The purpose of these glands is uncertain, but those on the face may be used in breeding behaviors. The foot glands might also be related to reproduction, but alternative functions, such as secretion of a waste product or a scent marker to help lost sheep find their flock, have also been proposed. The ram uses his vomeronasal organ (sometimes called the Jacobson's organ) to sense the pheromones of ewes and detect when they are in estrus. The ewe uses her vomeronasal organ for early recognition of her neonate lamb.

=== Comparison with goats ===
Sheep and goats are closely related: both are in the subfamily Caprinae. However, they are separate species with different numbers of chromosomes (54 in sheep and 60 in goats), so they seldom interbreed. Their hybrids, known as geep, are rare; most have come from a ram mating a female goat, and hybrids of a buck (a male goat) and a ewe are rarer still. One buck–ewe geep became pregnant with twins, though it died before giving birth. Visual differences between sheep and goats include the beard of goats and divided upper lip (philtrum) of sheep. Sheep tails also hang down, even when short or docked, while the short tails of goats are held upwards. Also, sheep breeds are often naturally polled (either in both sexes or just in the female), while naturally polled goats are rare (though many are polled artificially).

=== Breeds ===
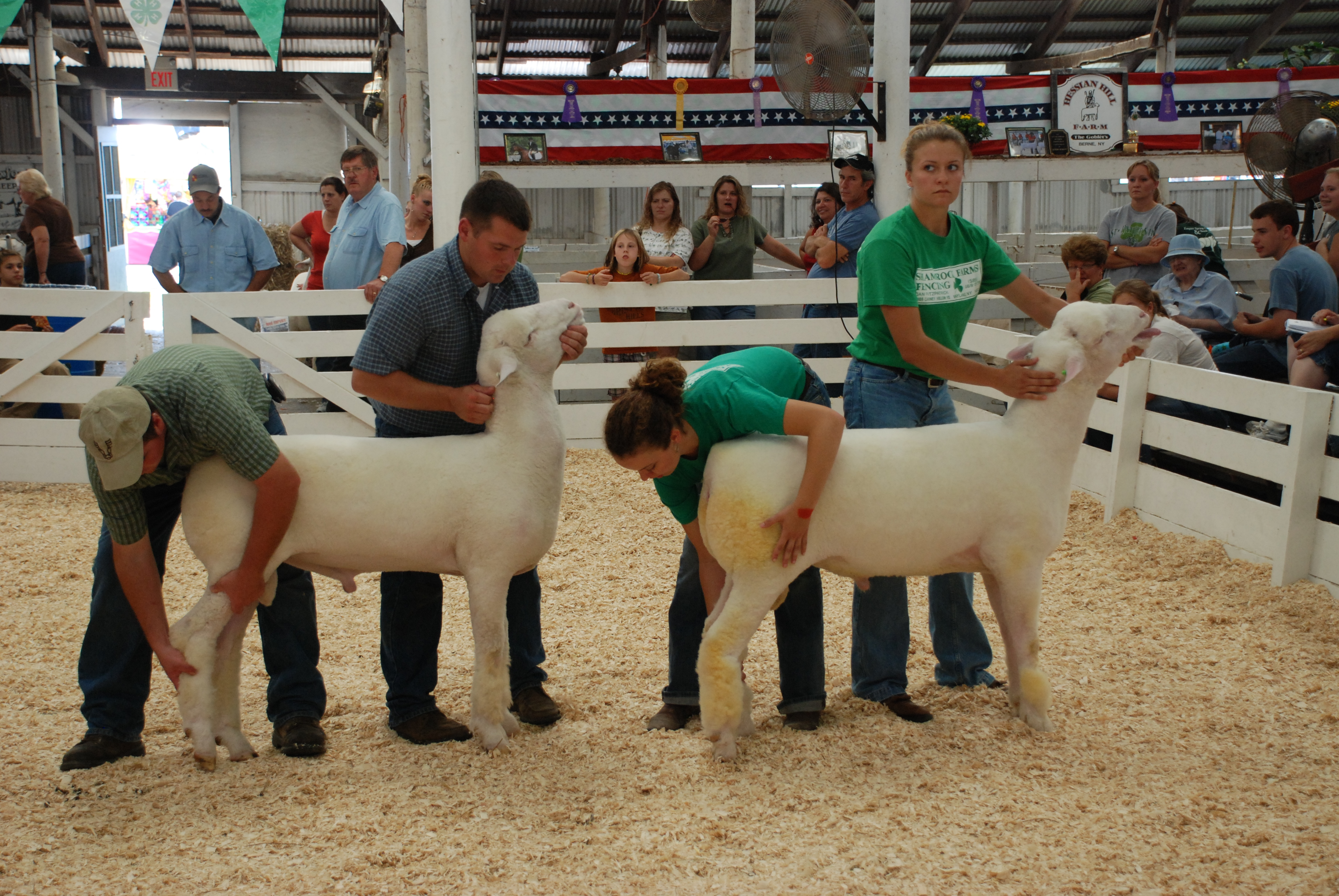
Sheep being judged for adherence to their breed standard

The domestic sheep is a multi-purpose animal. More than 200 breeds are recognized, created and bred to serve diverse purposes. Some sources who use the term more freely give counts exceeding a thousand different breeds. although most sources do not recognize the marginal and sub-breeds included in larger counts. The Food and Agriculture Organization of the UN (FAO) listed 1229 breeds as of 2006. Sheep are usually classified as being best suited to furnishing a certain product: wool, meat, milk, hides, or a combination. Other features used when classifying sheep include face color (generally white or black), tail length, presence or lack of horns, and the topography for which the breed has been developed. This last point is stressed in the UK, where breeds are described as either upland (hill or mountain) or lowland breeds. A sheep may also be of a fat-tailed type, with larger deposits of fat within and around its tail. In the wild, this fat tail could store nutrients, a useful trait in arid environments. In cultivation, they are generally dual-purpose sheep common in Africa and Asia.

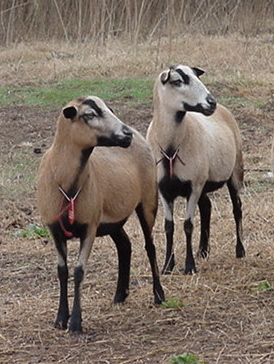
The Barbados Blackbelly is a hair sheep breed of Caribbean origin.

Breeds are often categorized by the type of their wool. Fine wool breeds are those that have wool of great crimp and density, which are preferred for textiles. Most of these were derived from Merino sheep, and the breed continues to dominate the world sheep industry. Downs breeds have wool between the extremes, and are typically fast-growing meat and ram breeds with dark faces. Some major medium wool breeds, such as the Corriedale, are dual-purpose crosses of long and fine-wooled breeds and were created for high-production commercial flocks. Long wool breeds are the largest of sheep, with long wool and a slow rate of growth. Long wool sheep are valued for crossbreeding and have been used to create new, merged sheep types. For example, the American Columbia breed was developed by crossing Lincoln rams (a long wool breed) with fine-wooled Rambouillet ewes.

Coarse or carpet wool sheep are those with a medium to long length wool of characteristic coarseness. Breeds traditionally used for carpet wool show great variability, but the chief requirement is a wool that will not break down under heavy use (as would that of the finer breeds). During the late 20th century and 21st century, the price of coarse wool has steadily declined, partially a result of excess wool from meat-class sheep usually being coarse. This has made raising sheep explicitly for coarse wool no longer profitable.

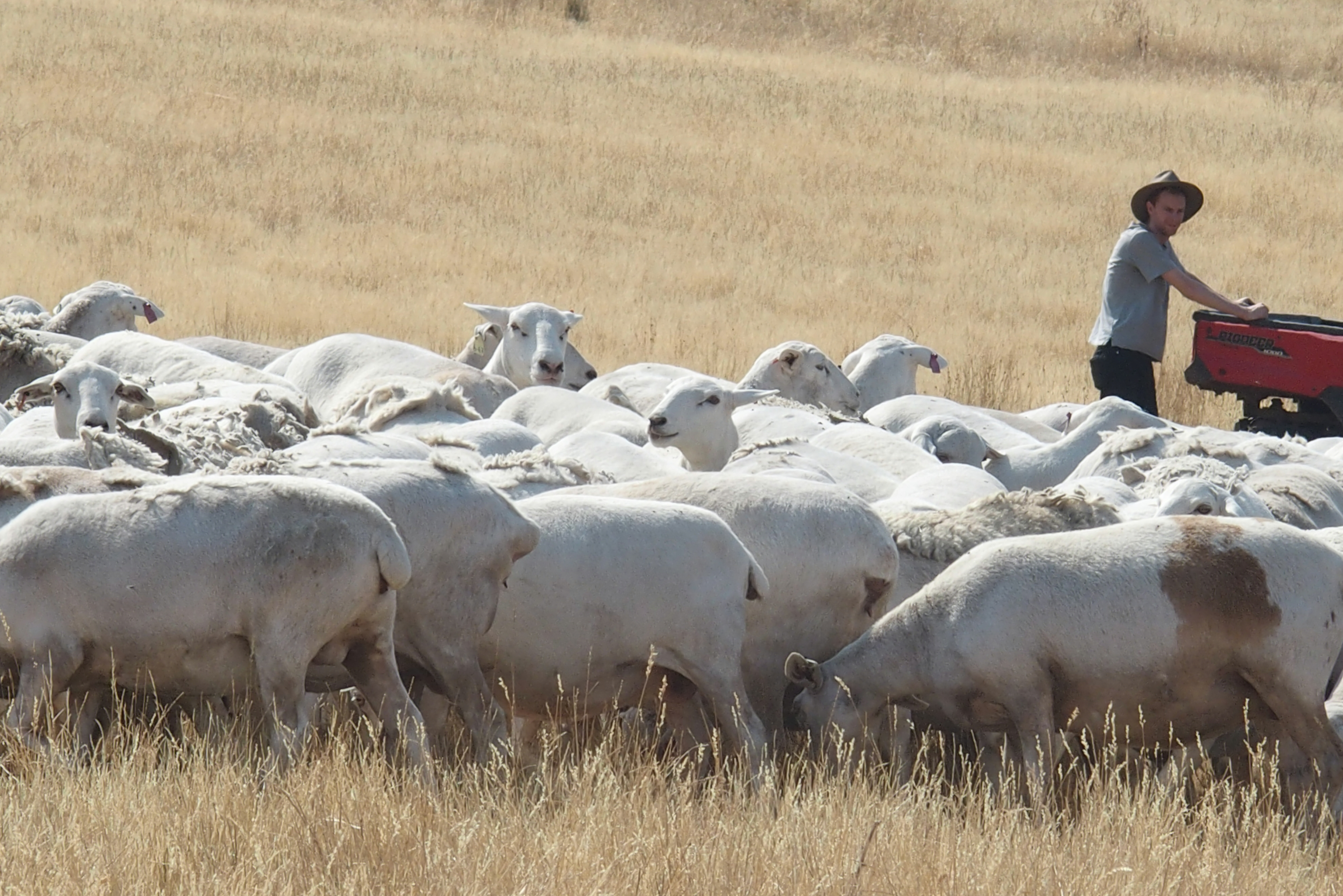
A flock of Australian White hair sheep in Mudgegonga, Victoria, Australia. This is a new breed of hair sheep suited for the hot and varied Australian climate.

One class of sheep are the dairy breeds, although they are much less common than dairy cows or dairy goats. There are a few breeds that are predominantly used for milking; there are also dual-purpose breeds that may primarily be meat or wool sheep can be used secondarily as milking animals. Dedicated dairy sheep breeds produce a higher quantity of milk and have slightly longer lactation curves. In the quality of their milk, the fat and protein content percentages of dairy sheep vary from non-dairy breeds, but lactose content does not.

Another group of sheep breeds is that of fur or hair sheep, which do not grow wool at all. Hair sheep are similar to the early domesticated sheep kept before woolly breeds were developed, and are raised for meat and pelts. Some modern breeds of hair sheep, such as the Dorper, result from crosses between wool and hair breeds. For meat producers, hair sheep are cheaper to keep, as they do not need shearing. Hair sheep grow coarse, brittle hairs called kemp over a short woolly undercoat that falls out each spring; in woolly breeds, selective breeding has largely replaced the kemp with wool that grows all year. Hair sheep are also more resistant to parasites and hot weather. As the price of coarse wool has steadily declined, there has become more interest in these sheep varieties and crossbreeding with them; it often costs more to shear meat sheep than is earned from selling the wool. In the Himalayas, sheep have been used as pack animals, carrying loads of about 12–18 kilograms (26–40 lb), such as salt or wool, on mountain tracks too difficult for larger animals.

The 20th and 21st century have seen the rise of corporate agribusiness and the decline of localized family farms. Large sheep holders generally favor keeping just the "best" breeds for the land and pasture they have available, in particular favoring fast-growing and fertile breeds. This has had the result that many breeds of sheep are in danger of extinction. The Rare Breeds Survival Trust estimated in 2008 that 22 breeds native to the United Kingdom as having 3,000 registered animals (each) or fewer, and The Livestock Conservancy listed 8 North American breeds as either "critical" or "threatened" in 2008. Heritage or heirloom breeds have been pushed to the margins of the sheep industry.

== Diet ==
=== Herbivory ===
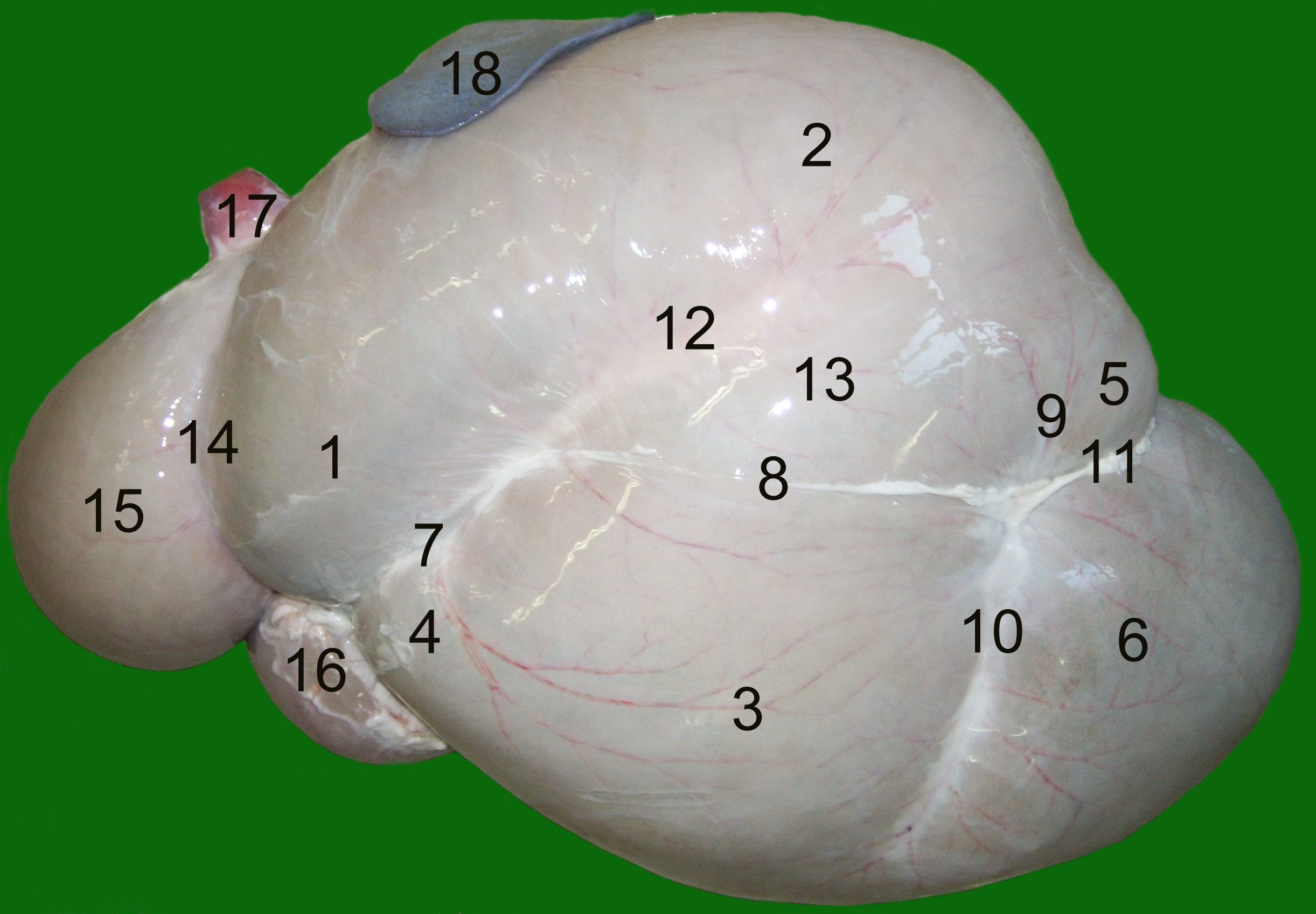
Ruminant system of a sheep

Sheep are herbivorous. Most breeds prefer to graze on grass and other short roughage, avoiding the taller woody parts of plants that goats readily consume. Both sheep and goats use their lips and tongues to select parts of the plant that are easier to digest or higher in nutrition. Sheep, however, graze well in monoculture pastures where most goats fare poorly.

Like all ruminants, sheep have a complex digestive system composed of four chambers, allowing them to break down cellulose from stems, leaves, and seed hulls into simpler carbohydrates. When sheep graze, vegetation is chewed into a mass called a bolus, which is then passed into the rumen, via the reticulum. The rumen is a 19- to 38-liter (5 to 10 gallon) organ in which feed is fermented. The fermenting organisms include bacteria, fungi, and protozoa. (Other important rumen organisms include some archaea, which produce methane from carbon dioxide.) The bolus is periodically regurgitated back to the mouth as cud for additional chewing and salivation. After fermentation in the rumen, feed passes into the reticulum and the omasum. Some feeds such as grains spend little time in the rumen and ferment rapidly. (Note: This has practical considerations in sheep husbandry. Sheep at a feedlot are put on grain-heavy diets to fatten them up for slaughter, but if not properly acclimated, the rapid fermentation of the grain in the rumen can cause acidosis and illness.) After the first three chambers, food moves into the abomasum for final digestion before processing by the intestines. The abomasum is the chamber most analogous to a human stomach in operation, and is sometimes called the "true stomach".

Other than forage, the other staple feed for sheep is hay, often during the winter months. The ability to thrive solely on pasture (even without hay) varies with breed, but all sheep can survive on this diet. Sheep also require minerals in their diet, either in a trace mix or from salt licks. One complication with sheep husbandry is that sheep are substantially more vulnerable to copper toxicity than other livestock. Copper, while needed in small quantities, becomes in large quantities a cumulative poison to sheep that is excreted very slowly. Sheep feeding on certain plants such as heliotropes can cause stored copper in the liver to be discharged en masse, resulting in sudden death. Careless farmers supplying to their flock mineral supplements designed for cattle, pigs, or horses that contain too much copper can cause sickness and death.

=== Grazing behavior ===
Rotational grazing allows farmers to avoid overgrazing.

Sheep follow a diurnal pattern of activity, feeding from dawn to dusk, stopping sporadically to rest and chew their cud. Ideal pasture for sheep is not lawnlike grass, but an array of grasses, legumes and forbs. Types of land where sheep are raised vary widely, from pastures that are seeded and improved intentionally to rough, native lands. Common plants toxic to sheep are present in most of the world, and include (but are not limited to) cherry, some oaks and acorns, tomato, yew, rhubarb, potato, and rhododendron. Just a few leaves of rhododendrons such as Azaleas can be lethal.

Sheep are largely grazing herbivores, unlike browsing animals such as goats and deer that prefer taller foliage. With a much narrower face and a split upper lip, sheep crop plants very close to the ground and can overgraze a pasture much faster than cattle. For this reason, many shepherds use managed intensive rotational grazing, where a flock is rotated through multiple pastures, giving plants time to recover. Sheep can both cause and solve the spread of invasive plant species. By disturbing the natural state of pasture, sheep and other livestock can pave the way for invasive plants. However, sheep also prefer to eat invasives such as cheatgrass, leafy spurge, kudzu and spotted knapweed over native species such as sagebrush, making grazing sheep effective for conservation grazing. Research conducted in Imperial County, California compared lamb grazing with herbicides for weed control in seedling alfalfa fields. Three trials demonstrated that grazing lambs were just as effective as herbicides in controlling winter weeds. Entomologists also compared grazing lambs to insecticides for insect control in winter alfalfa. In this trial, lambs provided insect control as effectively as insecticides. Sheep grazing labor has also been used to a limited extent for controlling hazardous species such as giant hogweed.

In the 21st century, sheep have been used in agrivoltaics, grazing plants near solar power arrays.

== Behavior ==
=== Flock behavior ===
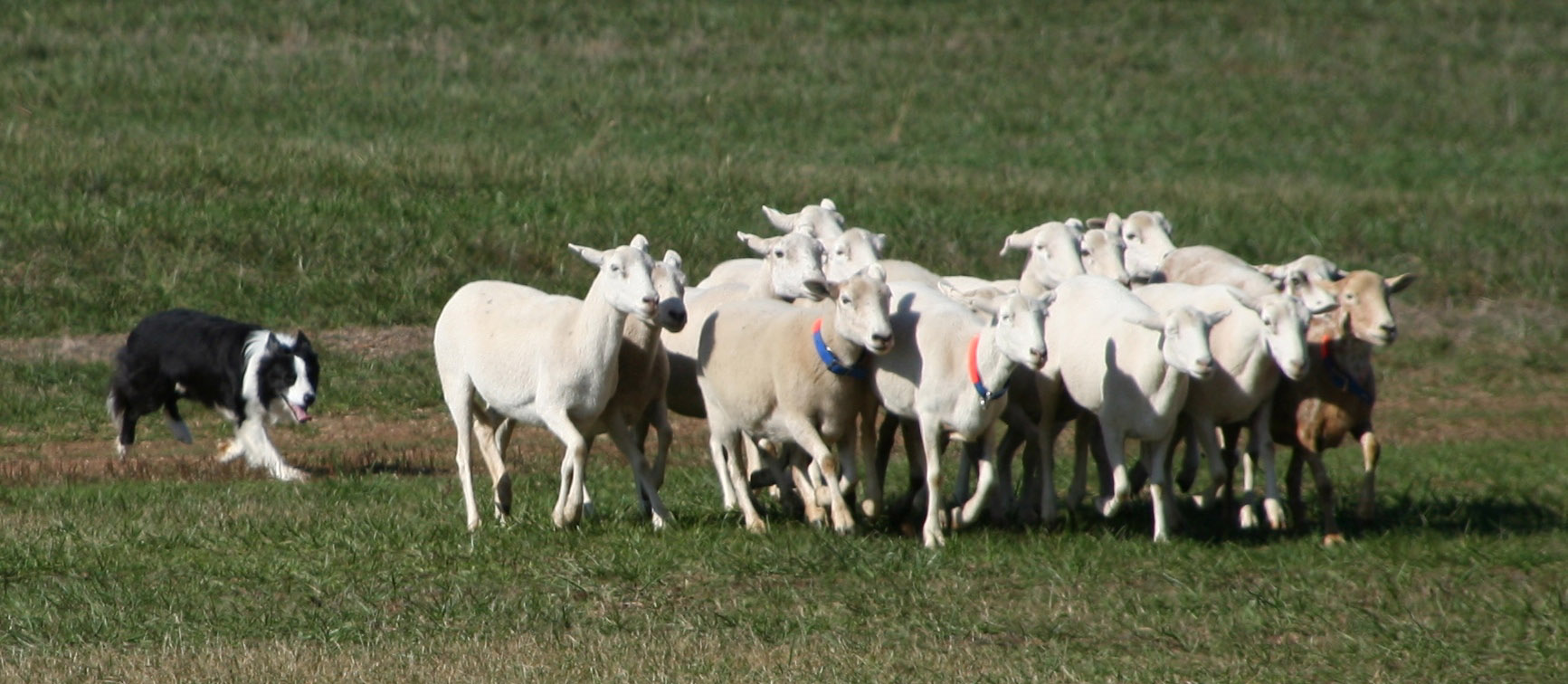
Sheep showing flocking behavior during a sheepdog trial

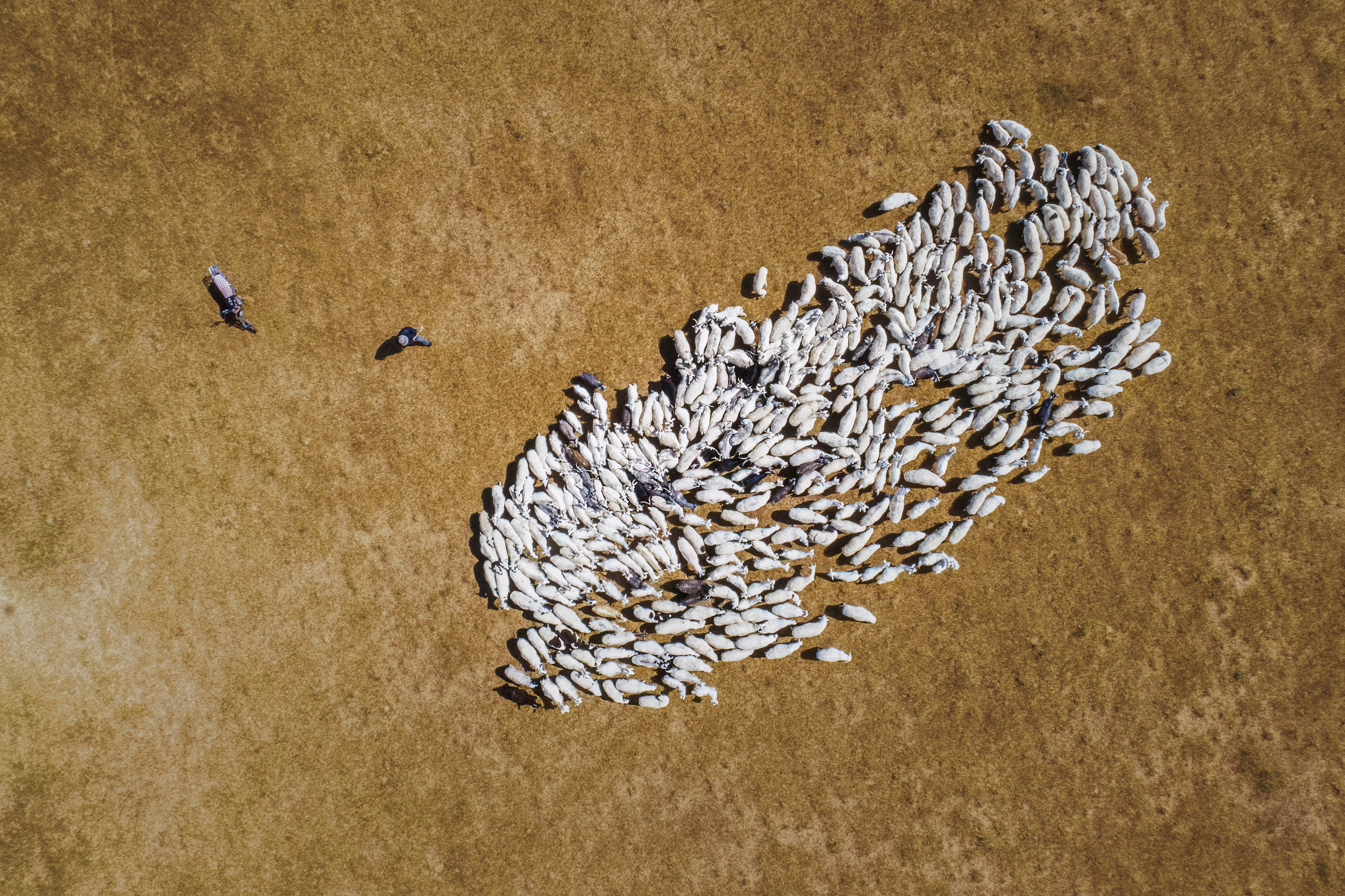
Shepherd herding a flock in China

Sheep are flock animals and strongly gregarious; much sheep behavior can be understood on the basis of these tendencies. The dominance hierarchy of sheep and their natural inclination to follow a leader to new pastures were the pivotal factors in sheep being one of the first domesticated livestock species. Furthermore, in contrast to the red deer and gazelle (two other ungulates of primary importance to meat production in prehistoric times), sheep do not defend territories although they do form home ranges. All sheep have a tendency to congregate close to other members of a flock, although this behavior varies with breed; sheep can become stressed when separated from their flock members. During flocking, sheep have a strong tendency to follow, and a leader may simply be the first individual to move. Shepherds have often trained a wether (a castrated ram or goat) to lead the flock on voice command. Relationships in flocks tend to be closest among related sheep: in mixed-breed flocks, subgroups of the same breed tend to form, and a ewe and her direct descendants often move as a unit within large flocks. Sheep can become hefted to one particular local pasture (heft) so they do not roam freely in unfenced landscapes. Lambs learn the heft from ewes and if whole flocks are culled it must be retaught to the replacement animals.

Sight is a vital part of sheep communication, and when grazing, they maintain visual contact with each other. Each sheep lifts its head upwards to check the position of other sheep in the flock. This constant monitoring is probably what keeps the sheep in a flock as they move along grazing. Sheep become stressed when isolated; this stress is reduced if they are provided with a mirror, indicating that the sight of other sheep reduces stress.

Flock behavior in sheep is generally only exhibited in groups of four or more sheep; fewer sheep may not react as expected when alone or with few other sheep. Being a prey species, the primary defense mechanism of sheep is to flee from danger when their flight zone is entered. Cornered sheep may warn via any of hoof stamping, jumping, or adopting an aggressive posture. They will charge and butt if they decide to fight, most notably for ewes protecting newborn lambs, and rams. The English verb "ram" directly comes from male sheep charging at targets of their ire, "ramming" them.

In regions where sheep have no natural predators, none of the native breeds of sheep exhibit a strong flocking behavior.

==== Herding ====
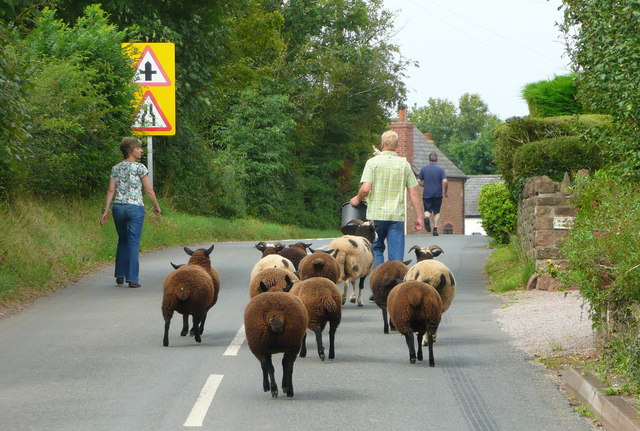
Escaped sheep being led back to pasture with the enticement of food. This method of moving sheep works best with smaller flocks.

Farmers exploit flocking behavior to keep sheep together on unfenced pastures such as in hill farming, and to move them more easily. For this purpose shepherds often use herding dogs. Humans can also herd sheep directly, most effectively with a promise of food, such as presenting a bucket of feed to them and carrying it in the desired direction. Association of humans with regular feeding results in sheep soliciting humans, essentially taking the behavior lambs have with their mothers and applying it to humans as well (e.g. bleating or pressing their noses for attention and food).

=== Dominance hierarchy ===
Sheep establish a dominance hierarchy through fighting, threats and competitiveness. Dominant animals are inclined to be more aggressive with other sheep, and usually feed first at troughs. Primarily among rams, horn size is a factor in the flock hierarchy. Rams with different size horns may be less inclined to fight to establish the dominance order, while rams with similarly sized horns are more so. Merinos have an almost linear hierarchy whereas there is a less rigid structure in Border Leicesters when a competitive feeding situation arises.

In sheep, position in a moving flock is highly correlated with social dominance, but there is no definitive study to show consistent voluntary leadership by an individual sheep.

In sheep husbandry, unfamiliar rams will often spar with each other to establish dominance; rams can potentially injure one another in such sparring. It is usually recommended that rams be penned near each other while unable to harm the other for a day or two. Rams may also butt their human handlers, especially if they are unwisely treated familiarly while lambs.

=== Intelligence and learning ability ===
Sheep are frequently thought of as unintelligent animals. The 18th-century naturalist Georges-Louis Leclerc wrote that the "weakness and stupidity of the sheep" was so extreme as that "without the assistance of man, the sheep could never have subsisted, or continued its species in a wild state," adding that they were "contemptible (...) and devoid of every mental quality." Many shepherds are eager to share stories of particularly stupid ways a sheep in their flock got themselves killed, such as by getting their head stuck in a fence and breaking their neck in trying to escape.

Despite these perceptions, there is evidence that sheep are not as dumb as traditionally portrayed. This portrayal is not universal: cultures that prize independence tend to be more likely to depict sheep as unintelligent; cultures with a strong emphasis on collective security do not, seeing the flocking instincts of sheep as a wise survival strategy for the whole. Another aspect swaying perception of sheep as stupid is that commercially farmed sheep live in a very different situation than feral sheep. Thelma Rowell performed a study of feral sheep that observed inter-flock communication, long-term relationships, and techniques for leadership and reconciliation between clashing sheep. A University of Illinois monograph on sheep reported their intelligence to be just below that of pigs and on par with that of cattle. In a study published in Nature in 2001, Keith M. Kendrick and others reported: "Sheep recognize and are attracted to individual sheep and humans by their faces, as they possess similar specialized neural systems in the temporal and frontal lobes ... individual sheep can remember 50 other different sheep faces for over 2 years". In addition to long-term facial recognition of individuals, sheep can also differentiate emotional states through facial characteristics. If worked with patiently, sheep may learn their names, and many sheep are trained to be led by halter for showing and other purposes. Sheep have also responded well to clicker training.

It has been reported that some sheep have apparently shown problem-solving abilities; a flock in West Yorkshire, England, allegedly found a way to get over cattle grids by rolling on their backs, although documentation of this has relied on anecdotal accounts. Merino sheep tested for their performance in mazes have shown the ability to learn from previous runs through a maze.

=== Vocalizations ===
A sheep bleating
A sheep bleat

Sounds made by domestic sheep include bleats, grunts, rumbles and snorts. Bleating ("baaing") is used mostly for contact communication, especially between dam and lambs, but also at times between other flock members. The bleats of individual sheep are distinctive, enabling the ewe and her lambs to recognize each other's vocalizations. Vocal communication between lambs and their dam declines to a very low level within several weeks after parturition. A variety of bleats may be heard, depending on sheep age and circumstances. Apart from contact communication, bleating may signal distress, frustration or impatience; however, sheep are usually silent when in pain. Isolation commonly prompts bleating by sheep. Pregnant ewes may grunt when in labor. Rumbling sounds are made by the ram during courting; somewhat similar rumbling sounds may be made by the ewe, especially when with her neonate lambs. A snort (explosive exhalation through the nostrils) may signal aggression or a warning, and is often elicited from startled sheep.

== Reproduction ==
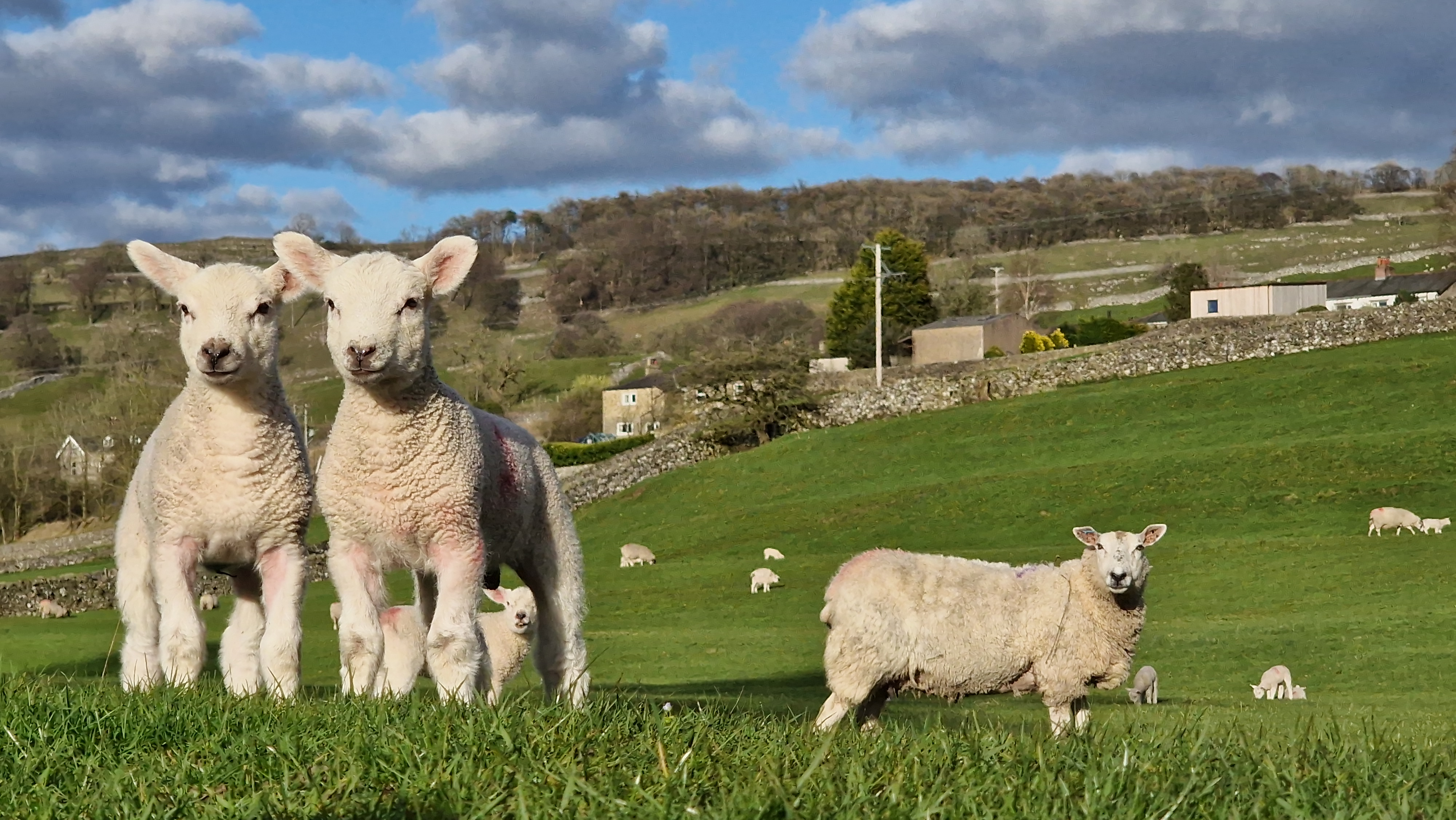
4-week-old lambs in the Yorkshire Dales

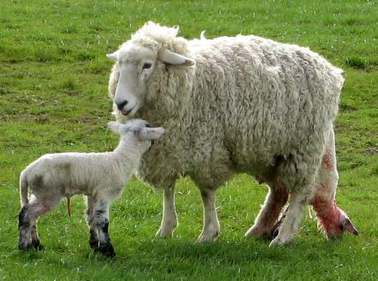
The second of twins being born

Sheep follow a similar reproductive strategy to other herd animals. A group of ewes is generally mated by a single ram, who has either been chosen by a breeder or, in feral populations, has established dominance through physical contest with other rams. Most sheep are seasonal breeders, although some are able to breed year-round. Ewes generally reach sexual maturity at six to eight months old, and rams generally at four to six months. However, there are exceptions. For example, Finnsheep ewe lambs may reach puberty as early as 3 to 4 months, and Merino ewes sometimes reach puberty at 18 to 20 months. Ewes have estrus cycles wherein they are in heat for around 30 hours on average every 17 days, although individual ewes can vary anywhere in a range of 12–48 hours. Ewes exhibit few external signs of being in heat; the best signal is that they will follow rams around, then stand still to be mounted. This has led to the use of "teaser rams" (vasectomized or castrated rams) by shepherds to detect which ewes are still unmated and need more time with the mating ram, or to be culled.

In feral sheep, mature rams live in all-male bands most of the year, but join female flocks during the autumn breeding season, commonly known as the rut. High-ranking rams engage in violent head-on clashes and flank-butting to defend estrous ewes from competing males. These contests reduce their forage intake and can leave adult males vulnerable to winter starvation, resulting in a skewed adult sex ratio the next spring.

After mating, sheep have a gestation period of about five months, and normal labor takes one to three hours. Most breeds produce single or twin lambs, with the occasional line producing triplets or more. During or soon after labor, ewes and lambs may be confined to small lambing jugs, small pens designed to aid both careful observation of ewes and to cement the bond between them and their lambs.

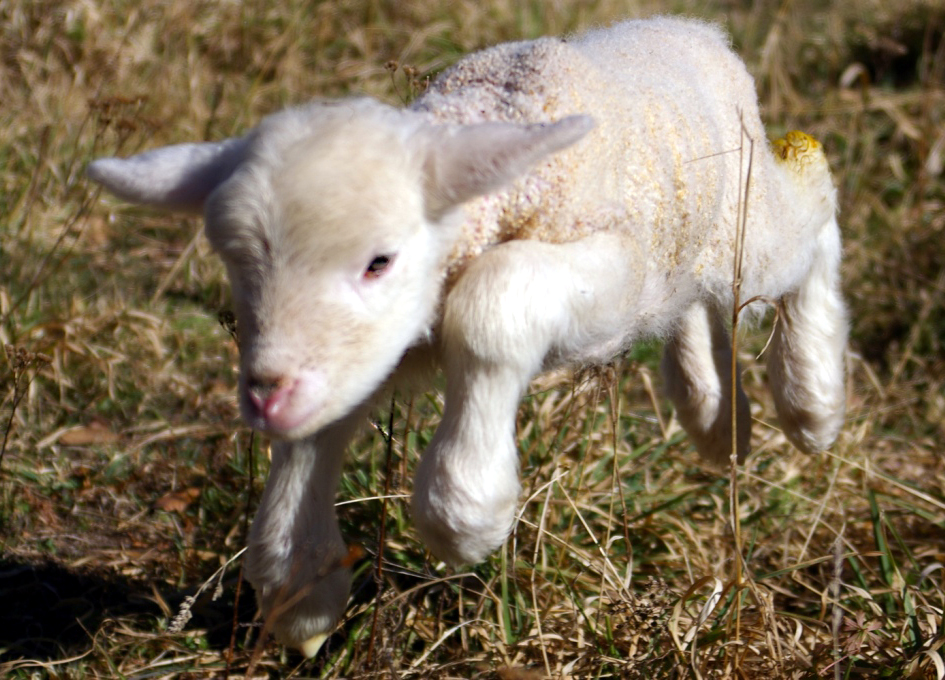
A lamb's first steps

Ovine obstetrics can be problematic. By selectively breeding ewes that produce multiple offspring with higher birth weights for generations, sheep producers have inadvertently caused some domestic sheep to have difficulty lambing compared to their wild brethren. It is in a sheep raiser's financial interest to intervene and assist such difficult lambing to save the ewe and her lamb, but this has reduced the influence of natural selection on encouraging easier and safer lambing, favoring instead higher peak productivity. In the case of problems, humans present at lambing can assist the ewe by extracting or repositioning lambs. After the birth, ewes ideally break the amniotic sac (if it is not broken during labor), and begin licking clean the lamb. Most lambs will begin standing within an hour of birth. In normal situations, lambs nurse after standing, receiving vital colostrum milk. Lambs that either fail to nurse or are rejected by the ewe require help to survive, such as bottle-feeding or fostering by another ewe.

After lambs are several weeks old, lamb marking, ear tagging, docking, and castrating are carried out. Vaccinations are usually applied in this period as well. Ear tags with numbers are attached, or ear marks are applied, for ease of later identification of sheep. Tail docking is commonly done 24–48 hours after birth (to avoid interference with maternal bonding and consumption of colostrum) and not later than one week after birth, to minimize pain, stress, recovery time and complications. Castration of male lambs was once done promptly during the first week of life in 20th century practice, but now usually happens around three or four weeks of age. The first course of vaccinations (commonly anti-clostridial) is commonly given at an age of about 10 to 12 weeks; i.e. when the concentration of maternal antibodies passively acquired via colostrum is expected to have fallen low enough to permit development of active immunity. Ewes are often revaccinated annually 3 to 4 weeks before lambing, to provide high antibody concentrations in colostrum during the first several hours after lambing. Ram lambs that will either be slaughtered or separated from ewes before sexual maturity are not usually castrated. Mulesing is a controversial practice now on the decline that scars a sheep's hindquarters in order to reduce the risk of flystrike and require less frequent crutching. Objections to all these procedures have been raised by animal rights groups, but farmers defend them by saying they save money and are necessary for sheep health.

Sheep are the only species of mammal except for humans which exhibit exclusive homosexual behavior. About 10% of rams refuse to mate with ewes but readily mate with other rams, and thirty percent of all rams demonstrate at least some homosexual behavior. Additionally, a small number of females that were accompanied by a male fetus in utero (i.e. as fraternal twins) are freemartins (female animals that are behaviorally masculine and lack functioning ovaries).

== Health ==
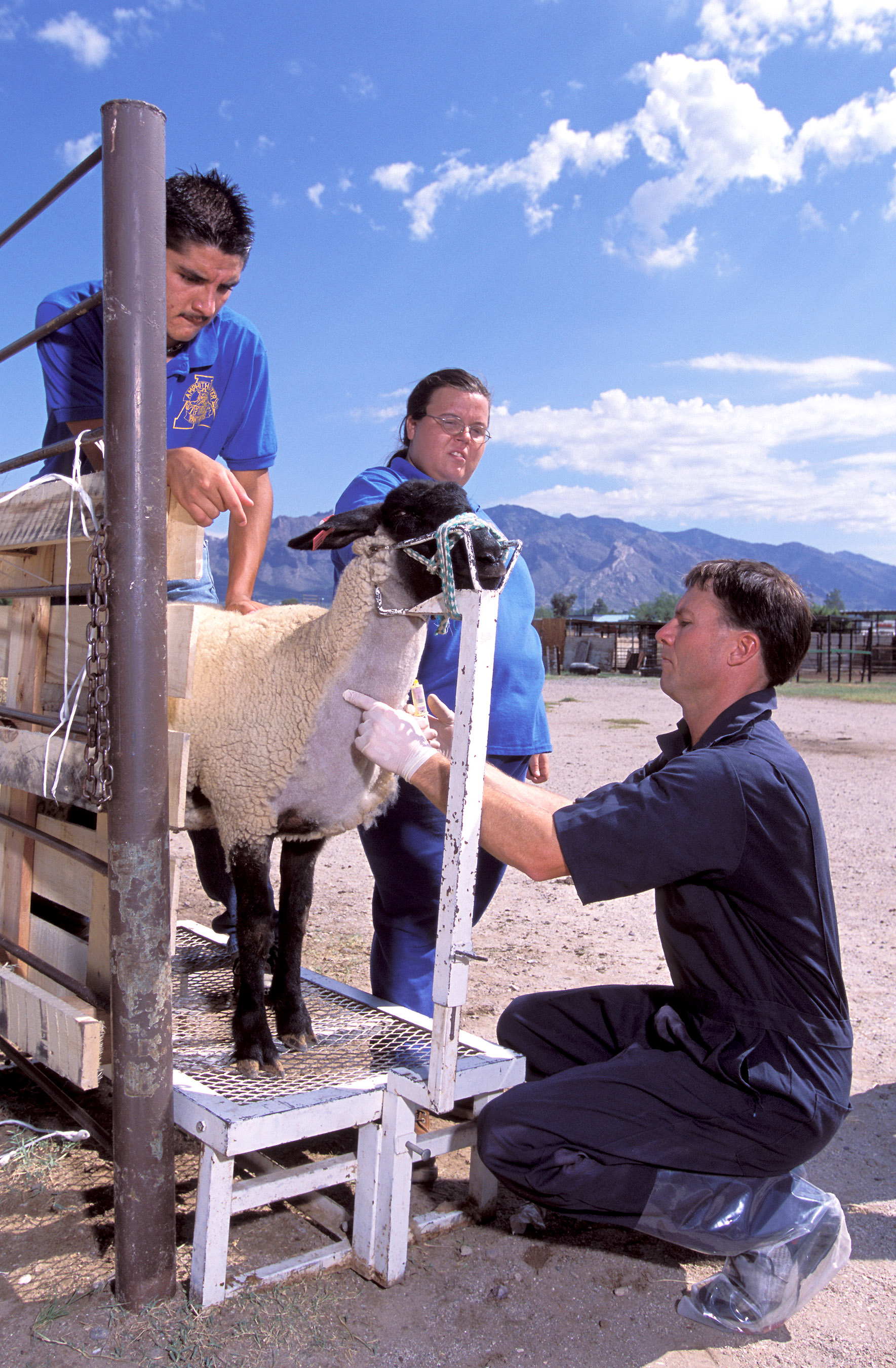
A veterinarian draws blood to test for resistance to scrapie

Sheep may fall victim to poisons, infectious diseases, and physical injuries. As a prey species, sheep try to hide signs of illness, to prevent being targeted by predators. This can cause unobservant shepherds to miss signs of a sheep in need. However, some signs of ill health are obvious, with sick sheep eating little, lying down excessively, and being generally listless.

Throughout history, much of the money and labor of sheep husbandry has aimed to prevent sheep ailments. Historically, shepherds often created remedies by experimentation on the farm. In some developed countries, including the United States, sheep lack the economic importance for drug companies to perform expensive clinical trials required to approve more than a relatively limited number of drugs for ovine use. Extra-label drug use in sheep production is permitted in many jurisdictions, subject to certain restrictions. (Note: In the United States, for example, regulations governing extra-label drug use in animals are found in 21 CFR (Code of Federal Regulations) Part 530.) In the 20th and 21st centuries, a minority of sheep owners have turned to alternative treatments such as homeopathy and herbalism to treat sheep veterinary problems. The effectiveness of alternative veterinary medicine has been met with skepticism by agricultural scientists. Certified organic farming with sheep requires eschewing certain medications, resulting in some shepherds recommending keeping two flocks – the lucky and healthy sheep who aren't immediately treated and stay in the organic flock, while any sheep needing anti-parasite drugs or antibiotics are moved into a standard flock.

Many breeders take a variety of preventive measures to ward off problems. Regulating sheep intermixing can check the spread of disease from flock to flock. This can mean verifying sheep health before they are transferred or purchased, and quarantining new sheep for two or three weeks. Good nutrition and good sanitation also greatly improve sheep health. Avoiding poisons is important; common poisons sheep can encounter are pesticide sprays, inorganic fertilizer, motor oil, and radiator coolant containing ethylene glycol.

Reducing stress in sheep is also important for their health. Restraint, isolation, loud noises, novel situations, pain, heat, extreme cold, fatigue and other stressors can lead to secretion of cortisol, a stress hormone, in amounts that may indicate welfare problems. Excessive stress can compromise the immune system. "Shipping fever" (pneumonic mannheimiosis, formerly called pasteurellosis) is a disease of particular concern, that can occur as a result of stress, notably during transport and (or) handling. Pain, fear and several other stressors can cause secretion of epinephrine (adrenaline). Considerable epinephrine secretion in the final days before slaughter can adversely affect meat quality (by causing glycogenolysis, removing the substrate for normal post-slaughter acidification of meat) and result in meat becoming more susceptible to colonization by spoilage bacteria.

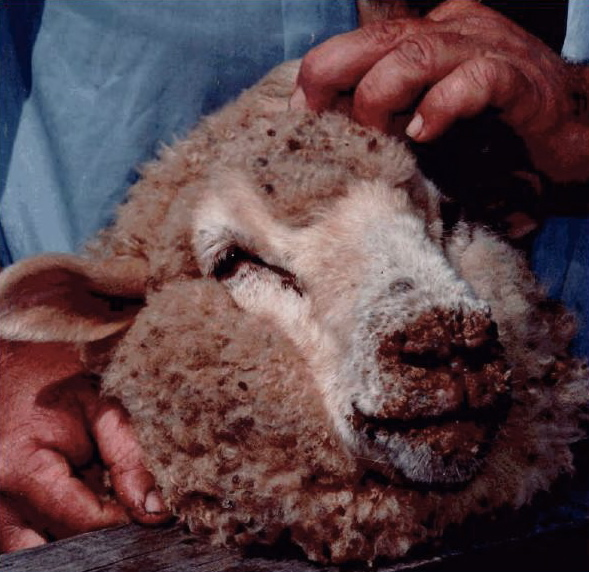
A sheep infected with orf, a disease transmittable to humans through skin contact

Both external and internal parasites are the most prevalent malady in sheep, and can reduce their productivity or outright kill them. To deal with this, common forms of preventive medication for sheep are vaccinations and a variety of medicinal treatments. Worms are the most common internal parasites, including roundworms, tapeworms, liver flukes, and others. They are ingested during grazing, incubate within the sheep, and are expelled through the digestive system, beginning the cycle again. Worms can cause diarrhea (scouring) in mild cases, and death in severe cases. Oral anti-parasitic medicines, known as drenches, are given to a flock to treat worms, sometimes after worm eggs in the feces has been counted to assess infestation levels. Afterwards, sheep may be moved to a new pasture to avoid ingesting the same parasites. External sheep parasites include lice, sheep keds, nose bot flies, sheep itch mites, and maggots. Keds are blood-sucking parasites that cause general malnutrition and decreased productivity, but are not fatal. Maggots are those of the bot fly and the blow-fly, commonly Lucilia sericata or its relative L. cuprina. Fly maggots cause the extremely destructive condition of flystrike. Flies lay their eggs in wounds or wet, manure-soiled wool; when the maggots hatch they burrow into a sheep's flesh, eventually causing death if untreated. In addition to other treatments, crutching (shearing wool from a sheep's rump) is a common preventive method. Some countries allow mulesing, a practice that involves stripping away the skin on the rump to prevent fly-strike, normally performed when the sheep is a lamb. Nose bots are fly larvae that inhabit a sheep's sinuses, causing breathing difficulties and discomfort. Common signs are a discharge from the nasal passage, sneezing, and frantic movement such as head shaking. External parasites may be controlled through the use of backliners, sprays, or immersive sheep dips.

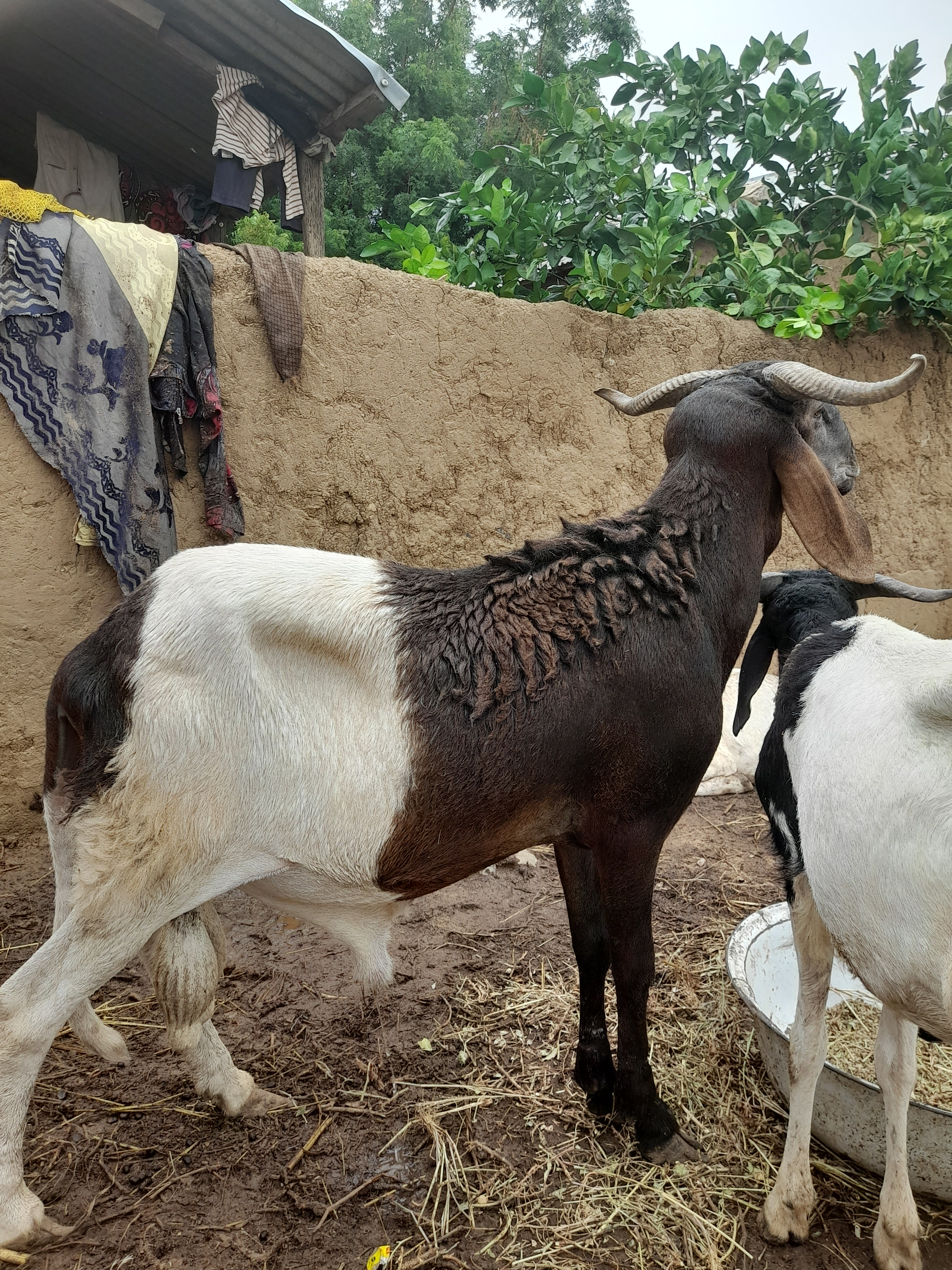
An Uda ram, Nigeria

A wide array of bacterial and viral diseases affect sheep. Diseases of the hoof, such as foot rot and foot scald may occur, and are treated with footbaths and other remedies. Foot rot is present in over 97% of flocks in the UK. These painful conditions cause lameness and hinder feeding. Ovine Johne's disease is a chronic, incurable wasting disease in which infected sheep lose weight despite eating normally, and usually die. Sheep are usually infected when young, but often show no signs until they are several years old. Bluetongue disease is an insect-borne illness causing fever and inflammation of the mucous membranes. Ovine rinderpest (or peste des petits ruminants) is a highly contagious and often fatal viral disease affecting sheep and goats. Sheep may also be affected by primary or secondary photosensitization. Tetanus can also afflict sheep through wounds from shearing, docking, castration, or vaccination. The organism also can be introduced into the reproductive tract by unsanitary humans who assist ewes during lambing.

Scrapie is a fatal prion disease of the nervous system of sheep and goats, with an incubation period measured in years. Foot-and-mouth disease (FMD) is a highly contagious viral disease of cloven-hoofed livestock that causes fever and blisters on the mouth and feet; it is often mild in sheep, who can spread it without showing obvious signs. The 2001 outbreak in the United Kingdom, one of the largest on record, led to the culling of about six million animals, 4.9 million of them sheep.

A few sheep diseases are transmissible to humans. Orf (also known as scabby mouth or contagious ecthyma) is a viral skin disease that can spread via skin contact. Anthrax usually kills sheep within an hour of symptoms appearing, and people can catch it from handling infected animals or their wool and hides. Enzootic abortion, caused by Chlamydia abortus, can spread to human women and cause miscarriage, so pregnant women are advised to stay away from lambing ewes.

Of the 600,300 sheep lost to the US economy in 2004, 37.3% were lost to predators, while 26.5% were lost to some form of disease. Poisoning accounted for 1.7% of non-productive deaths.

When all else fails, veterinarians can perform a necropsy on a dead sheep's carcass. While it is obviously too late to save that sheep, this can aid in understanding the cause of death, and if there is a broader threat to the flock.

=== Predators ===
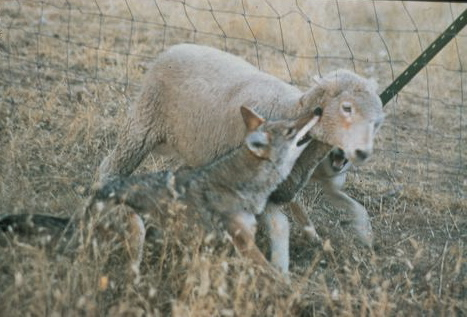
A lamb being attacked by coyotes with a bite to the throat

Other than parasites and disease, predation is a threat to sheep and the profitability of sheep raising. Sheep have little ability to defend themselves, compared with other species kept as livestock. Even if sheep survive an attack, they may die from their injuries or simply from panic. However, the impact of predation varies dramatically with region. In Africa, Australia, the Americas, and parts of Europe and Asia predators are a serious problem. In the United States, for instance, over one third of sheep deaths in 2004 were caused by predation. Some nations avoid this; predators are largely not a concern in New Zealand. Worldwide, canids—including the domestic dog—are responsible for most sheep deaths. Other animals that occasionally prey on sheep include felines, bears, birds of prey, ravens, and feral pigs.

Sheep producers have used a wide variety of measures to combat predation. Pre-modern shepherds used their own presence, livestock guardian dogs, and protective structures such as barns and fences. These older techniques have been adjusted; electric fencing began to be used in the 20th century in addition to regular fences, but is less effective on sheep (naturally insulated by their wool from electricity) than on cattle. Another recent adjustment has been penning sheep at night for sheep who normally externally graze. Modern shepherds use guns, traps, and poisons to kill predators, causing significant decreases in predator populations. In the wake of the environmental and conservation movements, the use of these methods now usually falls under the purview of specially designated government agencies in most developed countries.

The 1970s saw a resurgence in the use of livestock guardian dogs and the development of new methods of predator control by sheep producers, many of them non-lethal. Donkeys and guard llamas have been used on similar principles as livestock guardian dogs. Multi-species pasturing, usually with larger livestock such as cattle or horses, may help to deter predators, even if such species do not actively guard sheep. In addition to animal guardians, contemporary sheep operations may use non-lethal predator deterrents such as motion-activated lights and loud alarms, although light seems to be much more effective than noise.

== Economic importance ==
Live sheep

Global sheep stock
- in 2021

Number in millions
- 1. China: 186.4 (14.51%)
- 2. India: 74.3 (5.78%)
- 3. Australia: 68 (5.29%)
- 4. Nigeria: 48.6 (3.78%)
- 5. Iran: 45.3 (3.53%)
- 6. Turkey: 45.2 (3.52%)
- 7. Chad: 41.8 (3.25%)
- 8. Sudan: 41 (3.19%)
- 9. Ethiopia: 38.6 (3%)
- 10. United Kingdom: 33 (2.57%)
- World total: 1,284.9

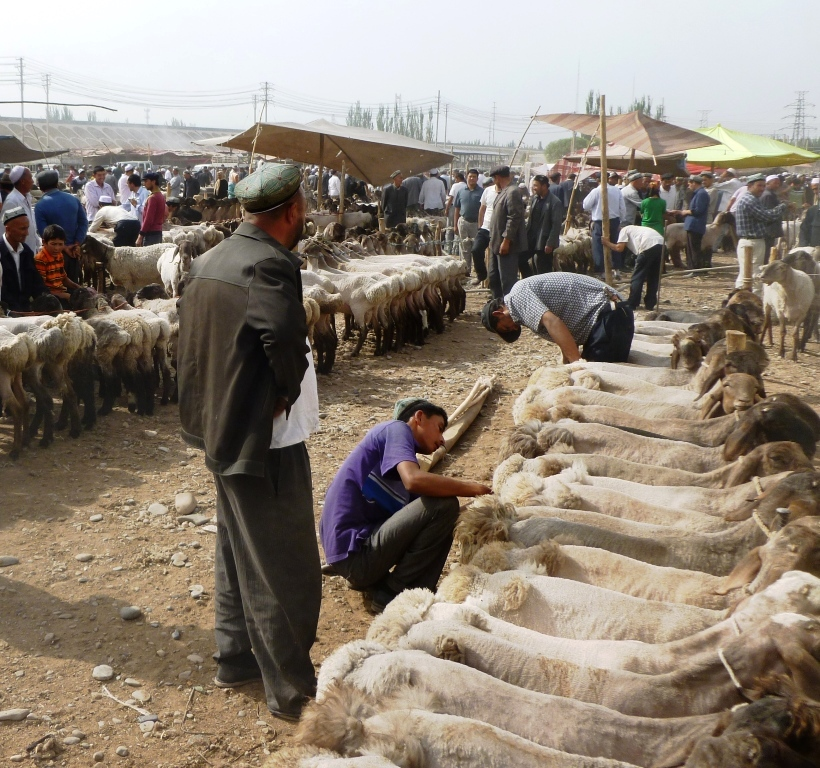
Shorn sheep for sale, Kashgar market, 2011

Sheep are an important part of the global agricultural economy. While historically of top importance and relevance, their status has been eclipsed in the 20th century by other livestock species, especially the pig, chicken, and cow. China, Australia, India, Nigeria, and Iran have the largest modern flocks, and serve both local and exportation needs for wool and mutton. Other countries such as New Zealand have smaller flocks by absolute size but are still a substantial portion of the local economy, with 10% of New Zealand's overall exports sheep-related. Sheep play a role in local economies, such as niche markets focused on organic or sustainable agriculture and local food customers. Especially in developing countries, such flocks may be a part of subsistence agriculture rather than a system of trade. Sheep themselves may be a medium of trade in barter economies.

Wool supplied by Australian farmers to dealers (tonnes/quarter) has been in decline since 1990.

Domestic sheep provide a wide array of raw materials. Wool was one of the first textiles and historically important for millennia, with wool felt dating perhaps to 6500 BC. In the late 20th century, wool prices began to fall dramatically. This was the result of the popularity and cheap prices for synthetic fabrics reducing demand, as well as a growth in the size of flocks in China that supplied wool at low cost. For some sheep owners, the cost of shearing is greater than the profit from the fleece. Fleeces are used as material in making products such as wool insulation for buildings. In the 21st century, the sale of lamb and mutton meat is the most profitable enterprise in the sheep industry, although less sheep meat is consumed than chicken, pork, or beef.

Sheepskin is likewise used for making clothes, footwear, rugs, and other products. Byproducts from the slaughter of sheep are also of value: sheep tallow can be used in candle and soap making, sheep bone and cartilage has been used to furnish carved items such as dice and buttons as well as rendered glue and gelatin. Sheep intestines can be formed into sausage. The intestine casing (wall), especially of lambs, has historically been used as catgut for surgical sutures, for stringing tennis rackets, and as strings for musical string instruments. Sheep droppings, which are high in cellulose, have even been sterilized and mixed with traditional pulp materials to make paper. Lanolin, the waterproof, fatty substance found naturally in sheep's wool, is used as a base for cosmetics and as a lubricant in other products.

Some farmers who keep sheep also make a profit from live sheep. Providing lambs for youth programs such as 4-H and competition at agricultural shows is one option. Farmers may also choose to focus on a particular breed of sheep in order to sell registered purebred animals, as well as provide a ram rental service for breeding. A more recent option for deriving profit from live sheep is the rental of flocks for grazing; these "mowing services" are hired in order to remove unwanted vegetation from public spaces and to lessen fire hazard.

Despite the falling demand and price for sheep products in many markets, sheep have distinct economic advantages when compared with other livestock. They do not require expensive housing, such as that used in the intensive farming of chickens or pigs. They are an efficient use of land; five to seven ewes and their offspring can be kept on the space that a cow and her calf would require. Sheep can also consume plants, such as noxious weeds, that most other animals will not touch, and produce more young at a faster rate. In contrast to most livestock species, the cost of raising sheep is not necessarily tied to the price of feed crops such as grain, soybeans and corn. Combined with the lower cost of quality sheep, all these factors combine to equal a lower overhead for sheep producers, thus entailing a higher profitability potential for the small farmer. Sheep are especially beneficial for independent producers, including family farms with limited resources, as the sheep industry is one of the few types of animal agriculture that has not been vertically integrated by agribusiness. However, small flocks, from 10 to 50 ewes, often are not profitable because they tend to be poorly managed. The primary reason is that mechanization is not feasible, so return per hour of labor is not maximized. Small farm flocks generally are used simply to control weeds on irrigation ditches or maintained as a hobby.

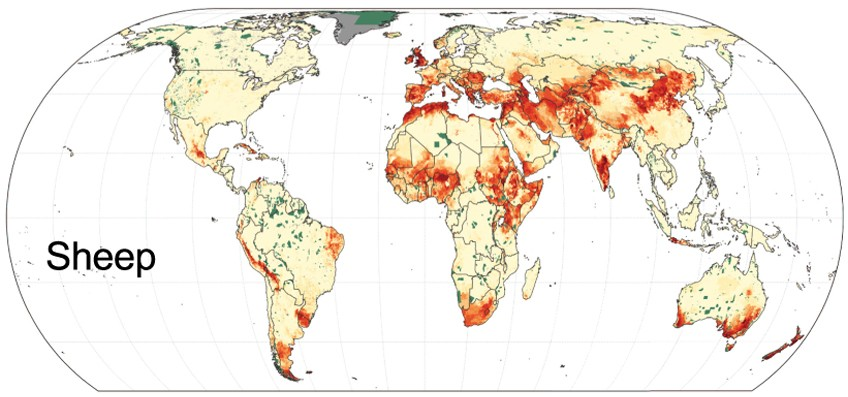
Sheep density across the world, in 2010

== As food ==
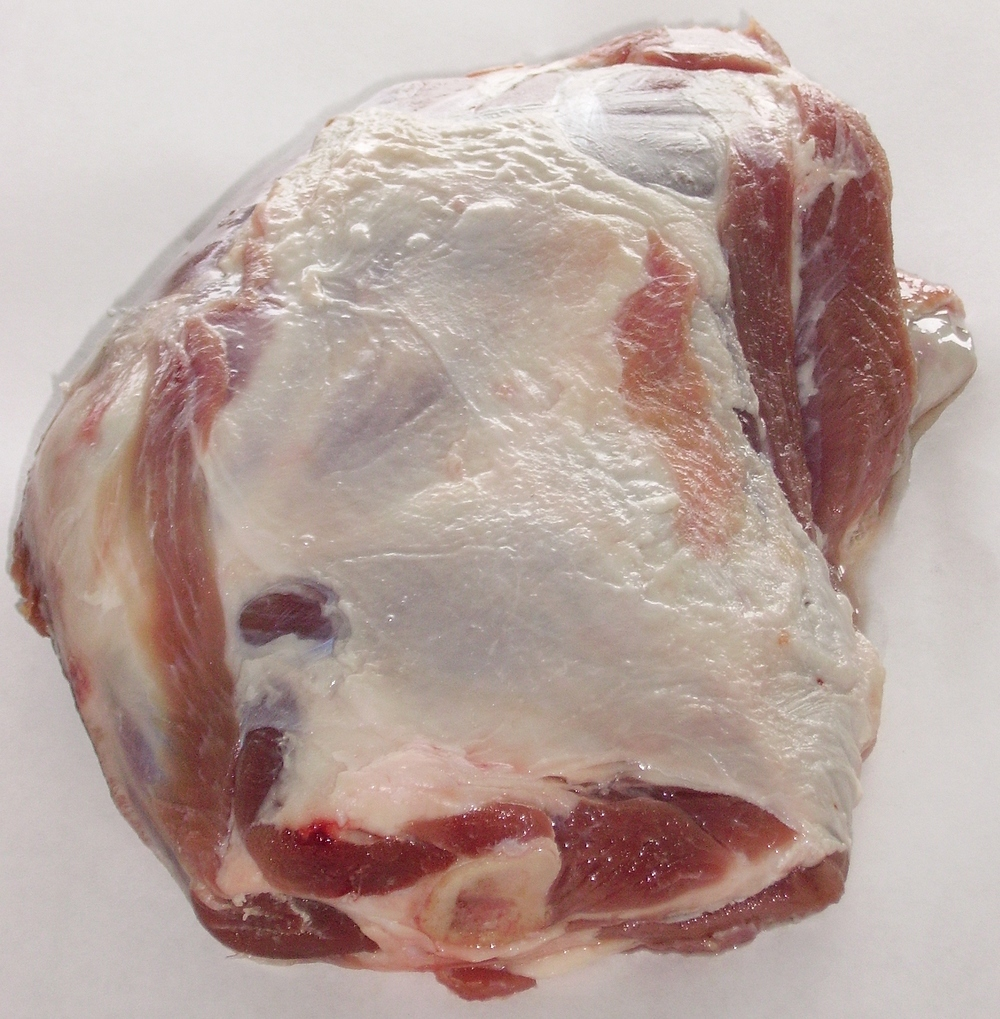
Shoulder of lamb

Sheep meat and milk were one of the earliest staple proteins consumed by human civilization after the transition from hunting and gathering to agriculture. Sheep meat prepared for food is known as either mutton or lamb, and approximately 540 million sheep are slaughtered each year for meat worldwide. "Mutton" is derived from the Old French moton, which was the word for sheep used by the Anglo-Norman rulers of much of the British Isles in the Middle Ages. This became the name for sheep meat in English, while the Old English word sceap was kept for the live animal. Throughout modern history, "mutton" has been limited to the meat of mature sheep usually at least two years of age; "lamb" is used for that of immature sheep less than a year.

In 2021–2023, the average person worldwide ate about 1.3 kilograms (2.9 lb) of sheep meat a year, against about 6 kilograms (13 lb) of beef and 10–11 kilograms (22–24 lb) each of poultry and pork. How much is eaten depends heavily on culture, and rises with population and income. China eats about a third of the world's sheep meat, while consumption per person is highest in countries such as Australia, Kazakhstan, and Turkey, at more than 4 kilograms (9 lb) a year. Mutton is also eaten in quantity in France, Africa, the Caribbean, the Middle East, and India. In these countries in particular, dishes comprising alternative cuts and offal may be popular or traditional. Sheep testicles—called animelles or lamb fries—are considered a delicacy in many parts of the world. An unusual dish of sheep meat is the Scottish haggis, composed of various sheep innards cooked along with oatmeal and chopped onions inside its stomach. In comparison, Americans eat less than 0.5 kilograms (1 lb) of sheep meat per person a year, against about 21 kilograms (46 lb) of pork and 25 kilograms (55 lb) of beef. In addition, such countries rarely eat mutton, and may favor the more expensive cuts of lamb: mostly lamb chops and leg of lamb.

Sheep have only two teats, and produce a far smaller volume of milk than cows. Fresh sheep milk availability is also highly seasonal, resulting in it rarely being sold directly. Instead, it is used predominantly in cheese and yogurt making. As sheep's milk contains more fat, solids, and minerals than cow's milk, it is ideal for the cheese-making process. It can also be frozen without harming its cheese- or yogurt-making qualities, letting producers stockpile milk through the seasonal gap in production. Well-known cheeses made from sheep milk include the feta of Greece, Roquefort of France, Manchego from Spain, Sirene from Bulgaria, and the pecorino romano (the Italian word for "sheep" is pecora) and ricotta of Italy. Yogurts, especially some forms of strained yogurt, may also be made from sheep milk. However, many traditional sheep's milk dairy products now have versions made with the more accessible cow's milk.

As with other domestic animals, the meat of uncastrated males is inferior in quality, especially as they grow. A "bucky" lamb is a lamb which was not castrated early enough, or which was castrated improperly (resulting in one testicle being retained). These lambs are worth less at market.

== In science ==
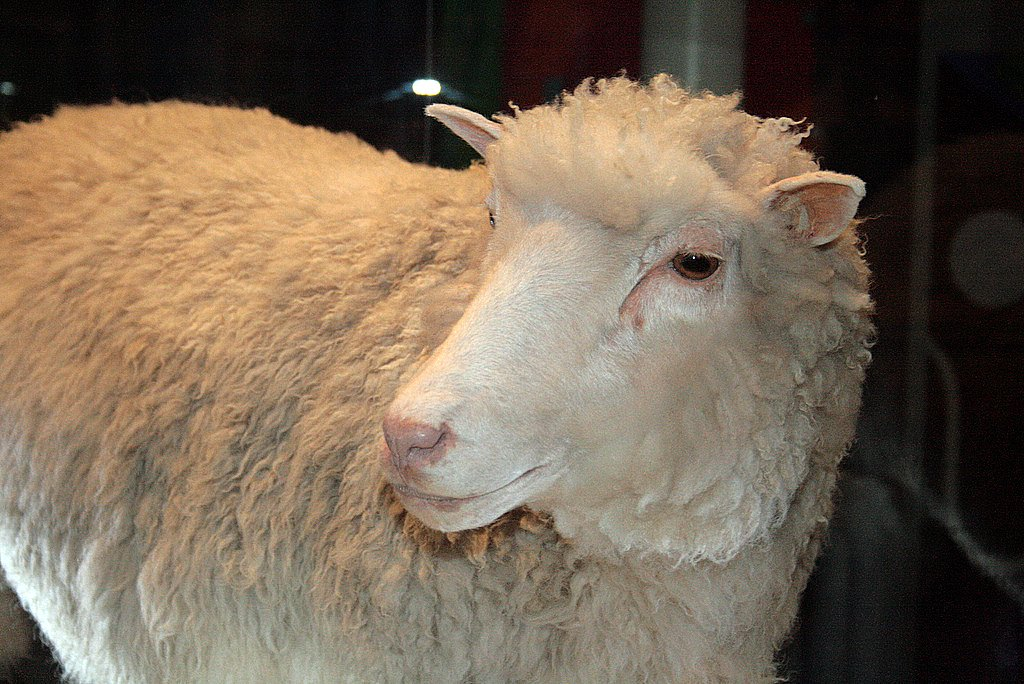
A cloned ewe named Dolly was a scientific landmark

Sheep are generally too large and reproduce too slowly to make ideal research subjects, and thus are not a common model organism. They have, however, played an influential role in some fields of science. In particular, the Roslin Institute of Edinburgh, Scotland used sheep for genetics research that produced groundbreaking results. In 1995, two ewes named Megan and Morag were the first mammals cloned from differentiated cells, also referred to as gynomerogony. A year later, a Finnish Dorset sheep named Dolly was the first mammal to be cloned from an adult somatic cell. Following this, Polly and Molly were the first mammals to be simultaneously cloned and transgenic.

The sheep genome was sequenced in 2014, and a detailed genetic map was published earlier. In 2012, a transgenic sheep named "Peng Peng" was cloned by Chinese scientists, who spliced his genes with that of a roundworm (C. elegans) in order to increase production of fats healthier for human consumption.

In the study of natural selection, the feral Soay sheep of St Kilda, isolated there since prehistoric times, have been used to explore the relation of body size and coloration to reproductive success. Soay sheep are either dark brown or light brown; the dark sheep were usually larger in size and yet declining in rate, contrary to the rule of thumb that larger animals tend to also be more successful reproductively. The dark-coat gene proved to be linked to genes that reduce fitness.

Domestic sheep are sometimes used in medical research, particularly for researching cardiovascular physiology, in areas such as hypertension and heart failure. Pregnant sheep are also a useful model for human pregnancy, and have been used to investigate the effects on fetal development of malnutrition and hypoxia. In behavioral sciences, sheep have been used in isolated cases for the study of facial recognition, as their mental process of recognition is qualitatively similar to humans.

== In culture ==
=== Folklore and literature ===
Sheep have had a strong presence in many cultures, especially in areas where they form the most common type of livestock. In the English language, to call someone a sheep or ovine may allude that they are timid and easily led.

Counting sheep is popularly said to be an aid to sleep, and some ancient systems of counting sheep persist today. Sheep also enter in colloquial sayings and idiom frequently with such phrases as "black sheep". To call an individual a black sheep implies that they are an odd or disreputable member of a group. This usage derives from the recessive trait that causes an occasional black lamb to be born into an entirely white flock. These black sheep were considered undesirable by shepherds, as black wool is not as commercially viable as white wool. The adjective "sheepish" can be used to describe embarrassment.

In British heraldry, sheep appear in the form of rams, sheep proper and lambs. These are distinguished by the ram being depicted with horns and a tail, the sheep with neither and the lamb with its tail only. A further variant of the lamb, termed the Paschal lamb, is depicted as carrying a Christian cross and with a halo over its head. Rams' heads, portrayed without a neck and facing the viewer, are also found in British armories. The fleece, depicted as an entire sheepskin carried by a ring around its midsection, originally became known through its use in the arms of the Order of the Golden Fleece and was later adopted by towns and individuals with connections to the wool industry. In Australian English slang, "riding on the sheep's back" is a phrase used to allude to wool as a key source of Australia’s national prosperity.

Sheep are symbols in fables and nursery rhymes like The Wolf in Sheep's Clothing, Little Bo Peep, Baa, Baa, Black Sheep, and Mary Had a Little Lamb; novels such as George Orwell's Animal Farm and Haruki Murakami's A Wild Sheep Chase; songs such as Bach's Sheep may safely graze (Schafe können sicher weiden) and Pink Floyd's "Sheep", and poems like William Blake's "The Lamb".

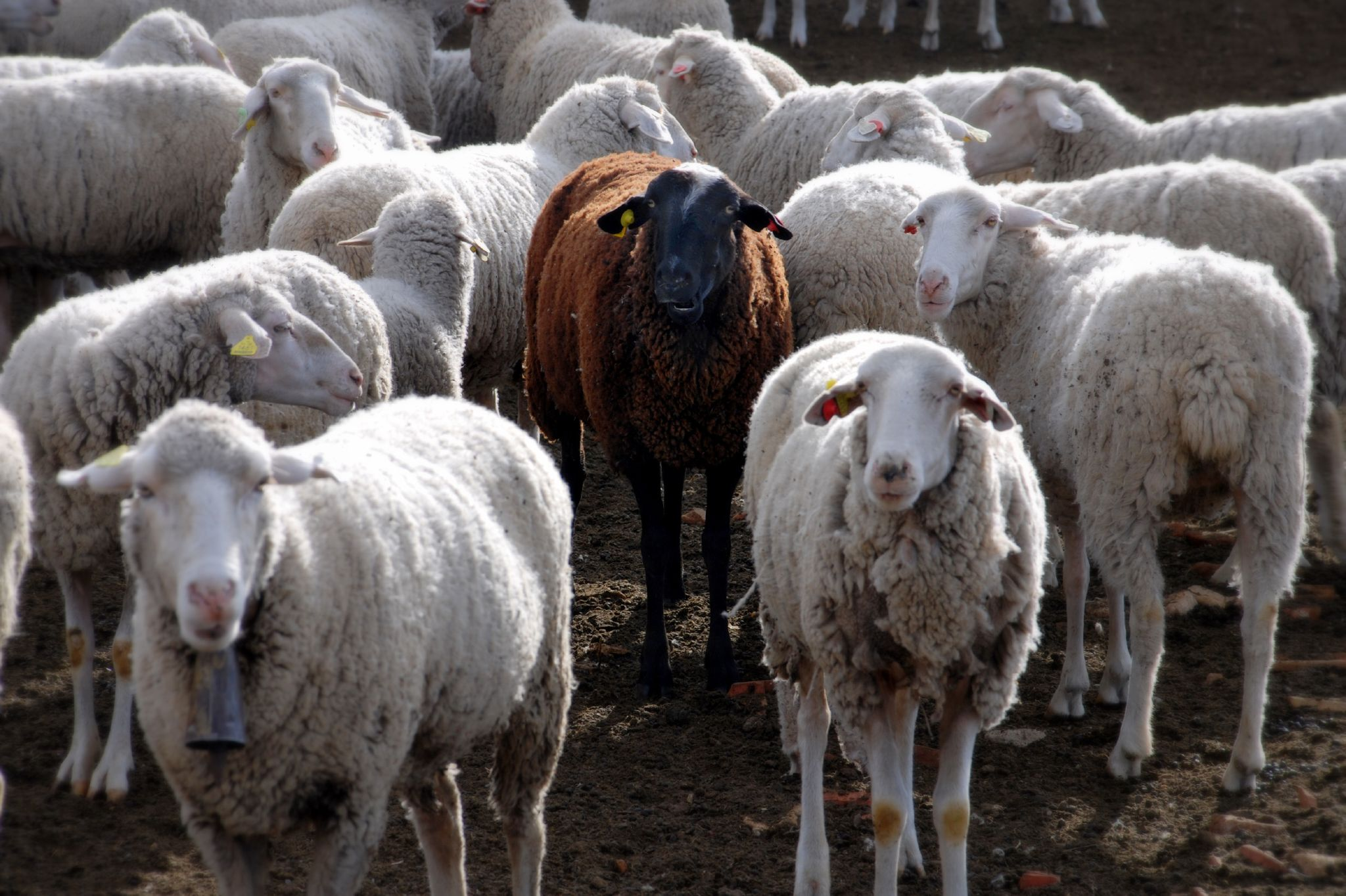
The proverbial black sheep

Head of ram pictured in the former coat of arms of Sääminki, Finland

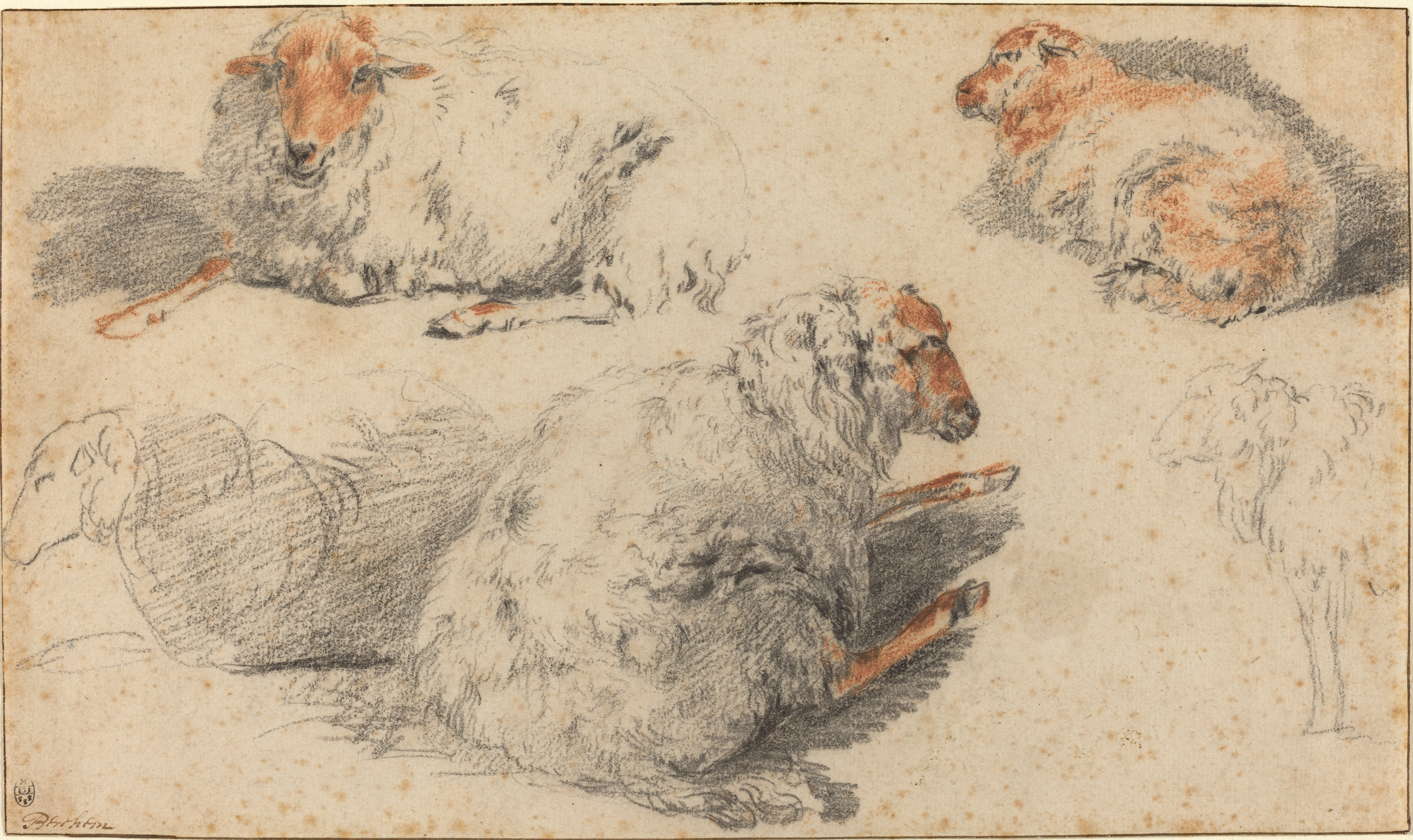
Nicolaes Pieterszoon Berchem (1620–1683), Sheep, black and red chalk (possibly crayon)

=== Religion ===
In antiquity, symbolism involving sheep cropped up in religions in the ancient Near East, the Mideast, and the Mediterranean area: Çatalhöyük, ancient Egyptian religion, the Canaanite and Phoenician tradition, Judaism, Greek religion, and others. Religious symbolism and ritual involving sheep began with some of the first known faiths: Skulls of rams (along with bulls) occupied central placement in shrines at the Çatalhöyük settlement around 6,000 BCE. In Ancient Egyptian religion, the ram was the symbol of several gods: Khnum, Heryshaf and Amun (in his incarnation as a god of fertility). Other deities occasionally shown with ram features include the goddess Ishtar, the Phoenician god Baal-Hamon, and the Babylonian god Ea-Oannes. In Madagascar, sheep were not eaten as they were believed to be incarnations of the souls of ancestors.

There are many ancient Greek references to sheep: that of Chrysomallos, the golden-fleeced ram, continuing to be told through into the modern era. Astrologically, Aries, the ram, is the first sign of the classical Greek zodiac, and the sheep is the eighth of the twelve animals associated with the 12-year cycle of the Chinese zodiac, related to the Chinese calendar. The Greeks and Romans both practiced the ritual sacrifice of sheep.

Sheep play an important role in Abrahamic faiths (Judaism, Christianity, and Islam); Abraham, Isaac, Jacob, Moses, and King David were all shepherds. The sheep has been cast as the archetypal sacrifice, with Abel's offering of the "firstlings of his flock". The Passover lamb is a traditional sacrifice (Korban) when commemorating Passover, although this practice has generally ceased in Rabbinic Judaism since the destruction of the Second Temple in 70 CE. According to the Biblical story of the Binding of Isaac, a ram is sacrificed as a substitute for Isaac after an angel stays Abraham's hand (in the Islamic tradition, Abraham was about to sacrifice Ishmael). Eid al-Adha is a major annual festival in Islam in which sheep (or other animals) are sacrificed in remembrance of this act. Sheep are occasionally sacrificed to commemorate important secular events in Islamic cultures. Ovine symbols—such as the ceremonial blowing of a shofar—find a presence in modern Judaic traditions.

In Christianity, Jesus is portrayed as the Good Shepherd with his followers his flock. Sheep are an element in the Christian iconography of the birth of Jesus. Jesus is also portrayed as the Lamb of God (Agnus Dei) in the New Testament, due to views of Jesus's death as being a new version of the sacrifice of sheep in Judaism. Christians read a passage in the Book of Isaiah as foretelling Jesus in which a "suffering servant" is led like "a lamb to the slaughter". In cultures influenced by Christianity, sheep have been held up as an ideal of innocence and resilience, if also passivity. Easter celebrations in Greece and Romania traditionally feature a meal of Paschal lamb. A church leader is often called the pastor, which is derived from the Latin word for shepherd. In many western Christian traditions bishops carry a staff, which also serves as a symbol of the episcopal office, known as a crosier, modeled on the shepherd's crook.

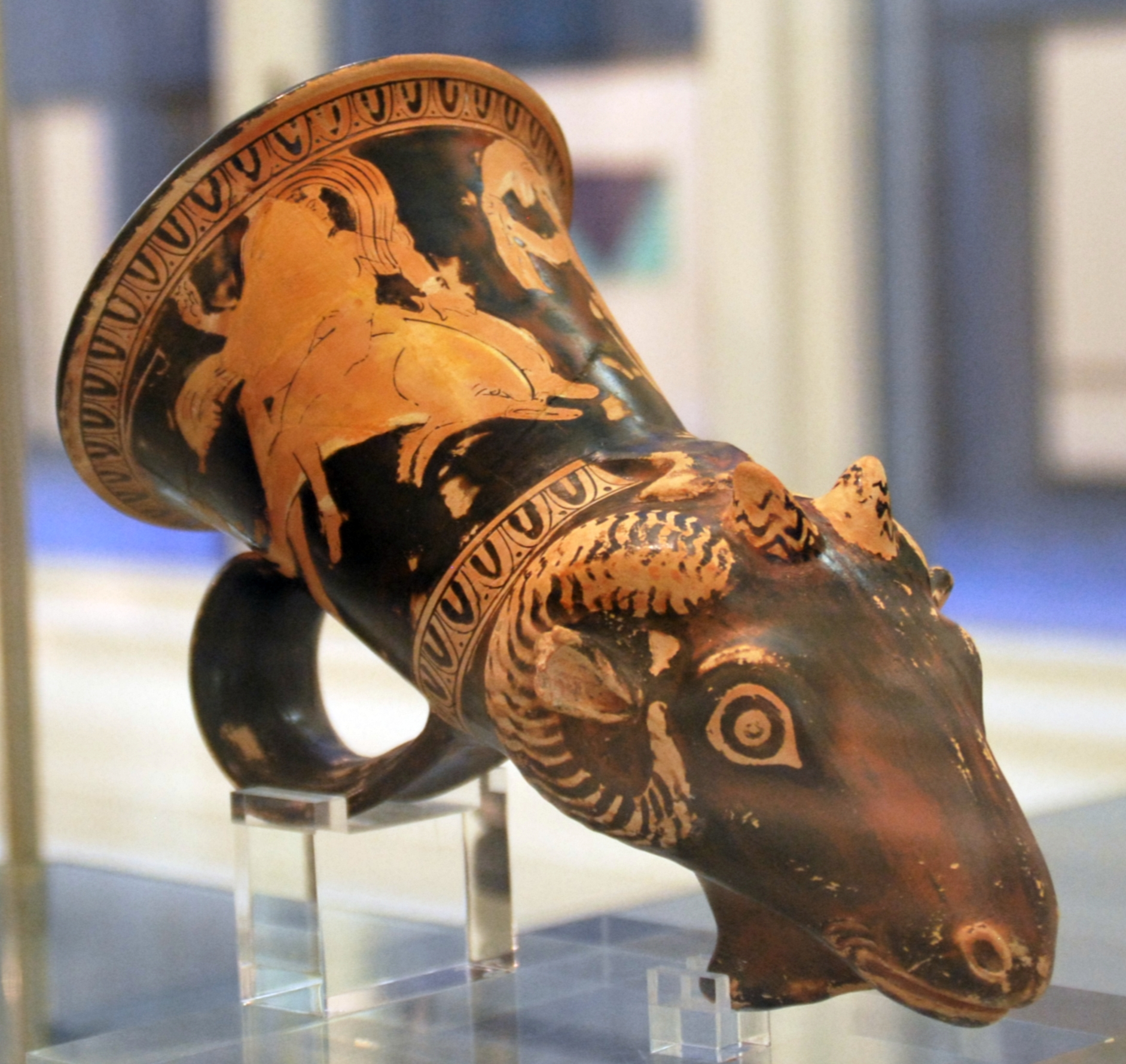
Ancient Greek red-figure ram-head rhyton, c. 340 BC

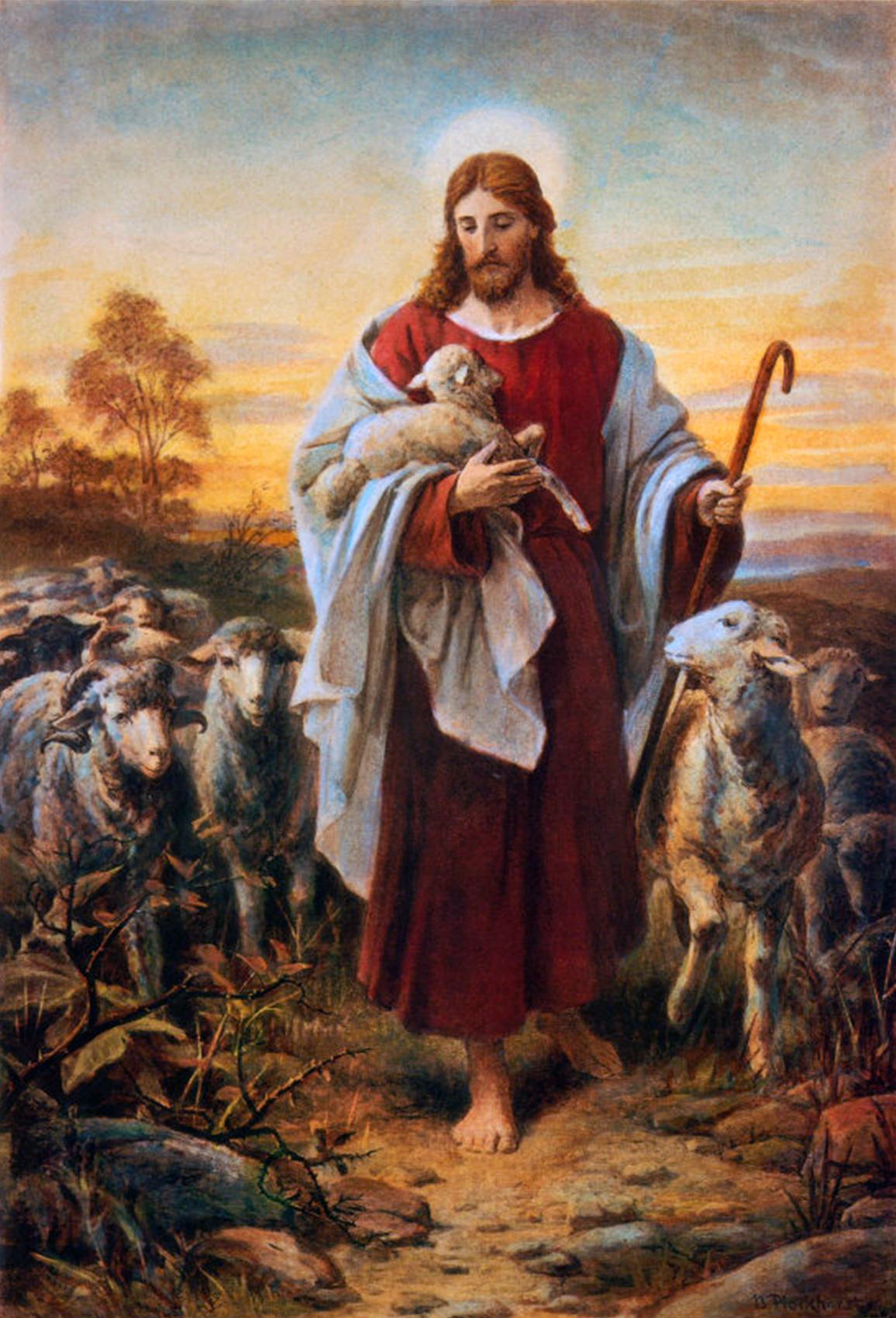
Jesus is depicted as "The Good Shepherd", and the Christians as sheep

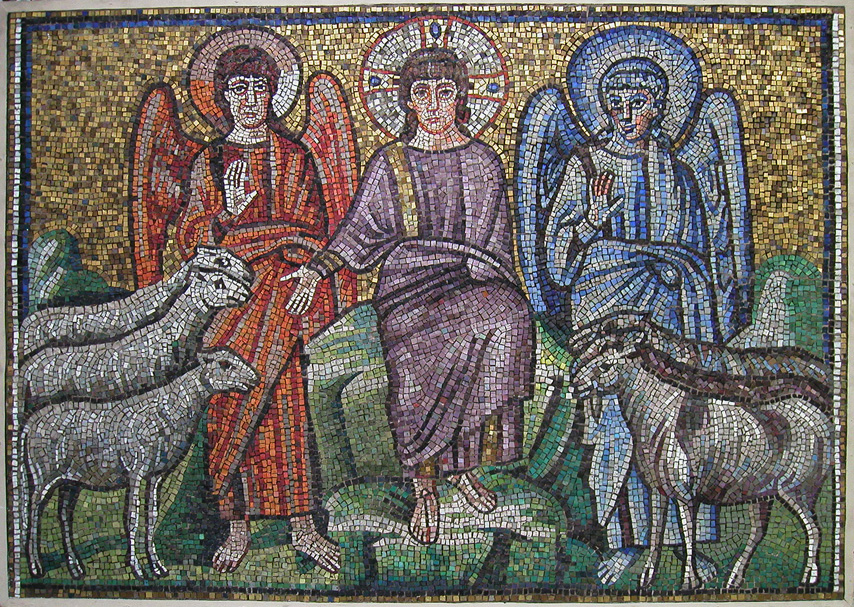
A depiction of separating the sheep from the goats, from the Gospel of Matthew

== See also ==
- Dry Sheep Equivalent
- Sheepfold
- U.S. Sheep Experiment Station

== Bibliography ==
- Armstrong, Philip (2016). Sheep. Animal series. Reaktion Books. ISBN 978-1-78023-593-6.
- Brown, Dave; Meadowcroft, Sam (1989). The Modern Shepherd. Farming Press. ISBN 978-0-85236-188-7.
- Budiansky, Stephen (1999). The Covenant of the Wild: Why animals chose domestication. Yale University Press. ISBN 978-0-300-07993-7.
- Clutton-Brock, Juliet (1999). A Natural History of Domesticated Mammals (2nd ed.). Cambridge University Press. ISBN 978-0-521-63495-3.
- Cottle, David J., ed. (2010). International Sheep and Wool Handbook. Nottingham University Press. ISBN 978-1-904761-86-0.
- Ensminger, Marion E. (2002). Sheep & Goat Science (6th ed.). Interstate Publishers. ISBN 0-8134-3116-6.
- Pugh, David G.; Baird, A. Nickie, eds. (2012). Sheep and Goat Medicine (2nd ed.). Saunders. ISBN 978-1-4377-2353-3.
- Ryder, Michael Lawson (2007) [1983]. Sheep & Man. Duckworth. ISBN 978-0-7156-3647-3.
- Simmons, Paula; Ekarius, Carol (2019). Storey's Guide to Raising Sheep (5th ed.). Storey Publishing. ISBN 978-1612129815.
  - Simmons, Paula; Ekarius, Carol (2009). Storey's Guide to Raising Sheep (4th ed.). Storey Publishing. ISBN 978-1-60342-459-2.
- Smith, Barbara; Aseltine, Mark; Kennedy, Gerald (1997). Beginning Shepherd's Manual (Second ed.). Iowa State University Press. ISBN 978-0-8138-2799-5.
- Weaver, Sue (2005). Sheep: Small-scale sheep keeping for pleasure and profit. Hobby Farm Press. ISBN 978-1-931993-49-4.
- Wooster, Chuck (2005). Living with Sheep: Everything You Need to Know to Raise Your Own Flock. Geoff Hansen (Photography). The Lyons Press. ISBN 978-1-59228-531-0.
- Sheep Production Handbook (8th ed.). American Sheep Industry Association. 2015. ISBN 978-0-9742857-6-4.
