= Cyclostrongylus elegans =

Scientific classification
- Domain: Eukaryota
- Kingdom: Animalia
- Phylum: Nematoda
- Class: Chromadorea
- Order: Rhabditida
- Family: Chabertiidae
- Genus: Cyclostrongylus
- Species: C. elegans

Binomial name
- Cyclostrongylus elegans Beveridge, 1982

Species of roundworm

Cyclostrongylus elegans is a species of oesophageal parasitic nematodes of macropodid marsupials in Australia.
