= Cyclostrongylus =

Scientific classification
- Domain: Eukaryota
- Kingdom: Animalia
- Phylum: Nematoda
- Class: Chromadorea
- Order: Rhabditida
- Family: Chabertiidae
- Genus: Cyclostrongylus; Johnston & Mawson, 1939

Species
- Cyclostrongylus alatus; Cyclostrongylus elegans; Cyclostrongylus irma; Cyclostrongylus kartana; Cyclostrongylus leptos; Cyclostrongylus medioannulatus; Cyclostrongylus parma; Cyclostrongylus perplexus; Cyclostrongylus wallabiae

Synonyms
- Oesophagonastes Mawson, 1965

Genus of roundworms

Cyclostrongylus is a genus of parasitic nematodes. Species are oesophageal parasites of wallabies in Australia.

Cyclostrongylus alatus and Cyclostrongylus perplexus are parasites of Macropus rufogriseus, the red-necked wallaby.
