= Cloacina (nematode) =

Scientific classification
- Domain: Eukaryota
- Kingdom: Animalia
- Phylum: Nematoda
- Class: Chromadorea
- Order: Rhabditida
- Family: Chabertiidae
- Genus: Cloacina; Linstow, 1898

Species
- See text

Genus of roundworms

Cloacina is a genus of parasitic nematodes in the family Chabertiidae. Species are parasites of marsupials in Australia.

== Selected species ==
- Cloacina annulata
- Cloacina atthis
- Cloacina caenis
- Cloacina castor
- Cloacina cloelia
- Cloacina clymene
- Cloacina communis
- Cloacina edwardsi
- Cloacina elegans
- Cloacina eos
- Cloacina ernabella
- Cloacina gallardi
- Cloacina hydriformis
- Cloacina io
- Cloacina liebigi
- Cloacina mawsonae
- Cloacina papillata
- Cloacina papillatissima
- Cloacina parva
- Cloacina pearsoni
- Cloacina petrogale
- Cloacina pollux
- Cloacina robertsi
- Cloacina similis
- Cloacina wallabiae
