= Marion E. Ensminger =

American animal scientist (1908–1998)

Marion Eugene Ensminger
- Born: 28 May 1908; Stover, Missouri, USA
- Died: 5 July 1998 (aged 90); Clovis, California, USA
- Other names: "Doc E"; Gene Ensminger
- Occupations: Animal scientist; educator; author
- Years active: c. 1934–c. 1995
- Known for: Contributions to animal agriculture
- Spouse: Audrey Helen Watts (m. 1941)
- Children: 1
- Awards: Bouffault International Animal Agriculture Award

Academic background
- Education: University of Missouri; University of Minnesota

Academic work
- Institutions: University of Massachusetts; University of Minnesota; Washington State College (1941–1962)
- Notable works: 22 books on animal science and husbandry

Marion Eugene ("Gene") Ensminger (1908–1998), affectionately known as "Doc E," was an American animal scientist, educator, and author. He made significant contributions to the field of animal agriculture and helped advance knowledge and improve practices in livestock management through his research, writing, teaching, and international outreach. He is the author of 22 books on animal science and husbandry.

== Biography ==
Ensminger was born on May 28, 1908 in Stover, Missouri, to a family with deep agricultural roots. He was the second of seven children who were raised on a general livestock and dairy farm. Ensminger completed a bachelor's degree in science and Master of Arts degree from the University of Missouri. He obtained his doctorate from the University of Minnesota in 1941. In the same year, he married Audrey Helen Watts, who hailed from Winnipeg, Canada. The pair met at the University of Minnesota where they worked together as colleagues. The couple had one son, John.

Ensminger began his career in 1934 as a manager of the Dixon Hills Experiment Station, which was operated by the University of Illinois. He then started teaching at the University of Massachusetts and, later, at the University of Minnesota. Ensminger began working as a faculty at Washington State College (now Washington State University) in 1941. He was appointed in 1944 as chair of its animal science department, a position he held until 1962. His initiatives included the establishment of a doctoral program in animal sciences for the university and the development of Hilltop Stables, which became one of the leading light-horse facilities in the U.S. His department achieved recognition for this highly rated program.

== Awards and recognition ==
Ensminger received several awards and recognitions. One of these was the Bouffault International Animal Agriculture Award, which cited him as “one of the world’s great humanitarians”. The University of Ukraine conferred on Ensminger in 1994 an Honorary Doctor of Laws degree in recognition of his works. the Iowa State University awarded Ensminger with an Honorary Doctor of Humane Letters degree for his achievements and contribution to animal science, education, and international agriculture; and a mural, painted in 1998 by Jason Gaillard, called The Life and Times of M.E. Ensminger, was donated to ISU and hangs in its museum. WSU also named its beef center, M.E. Ensminger Beef Cattle Center in his honor.

Ensminger died on July 5, 1998 at his home in Clovis, California.

== Research and initiatives ==
Ensminger published at least 22 books and authored numerous articles on animal science, several of which were written in partnership with his wife. His publications focused on animal breeding, nutrition, and management. His published handbooks were translated into multiple languages and are widely used resources in the United States by Northwest cattle producers.

Aside from his research work, Ensminger is also known for his extension works and initiatives for international agricultural technology schools. During the 1990s he partnered with Iowa State University to conduct lectures and seminars around the world. He was also the founder of the International Stockmen's School (later the Ensminger International Ag-Tech Schools), which seeks to expand knowledge about animal husbandry and agricultural technology as well as address problems such as hunger and malnutrition around the world. He founded schools in Russia, Ukraine, Cuba, and China, among other countries isolated by communism despite the criticism he received from government officials and friends. It is said that his schools and his AgriServices Foundation never obtained any support from the American government and were largely funded by overseas royalties from the sale of Ensminger's books. Ensminger and his wife established a scholarship at WSU, in support of upper division students.

Ensminger was a co-founder and the inaugural president of the American Society of Agricultural Consultants, established in 1964; and served as President of the AgriServices Foundation from 1962 until his death in 1998.
