= Psorergatidae =

Scientific classification
- Kingdom: Animalia
- Phylum: Arthropoda
- Subphylum: Chelicerata
- Class: Arachnida
- Order: Trombidiformes
- Suborder: Prostigmata
- Family: Psorergatidae

Family of mites

Psorergatidae is a family of parasitic mites in the order Trombidiformes.
