= Chabertia ovina =

Scientific classification
- Kingdom: Animalia
- Phylum: Nematoda
- Class: Chromadorea
- Order: Rhabditida
- Family: Chabertiidae
- Genus: Chabertia; Railliet & Henry, 1909
- Species: C. ovina

Binomial name
- Chabertia ovina (Fabricius, 1794)

Synonyms
- Strongylus ovina Fabricius 1794

Species of roundworm

Chabertia ovina, the large-mouthed bowel worm, is a species of parasitic roundworms that infects sheep, goats (occasionally cattle) and other wild ruminants. Infection of pigs are very infrequent. It is not known to be contagious to humans.

The disease caused by Chabertia worms is called chabertiasis or chabertiosis.

It is found worldwide but is more frequent in temperate regions.
