= Chabertiidae =

Scientific classification
- Kingdom: Animalia
- Phylum: Nematoda
- Class: Chromadorea
- Order: Rhabditida
- Suborder: Strongylida
- Family: Chabertiidae

Synonyms
- Chabertidae

Family of roundworms

Chabertiidae is a family of nematodes belonging to the order Strongylida. Members of the family Chabertiidae are gastrointestinal parasites.

Genera:

- Arundelia Mawson, 1977
- Beveridgea Mawson, 1980
- Bourgelatia Railliet, Henry & Bauche, 1919
- Chabertia Railliet & Henry, 1909
- Conoposthia Mawson, 1977
- Murshidia Lane, 1914
- Oesophagostomum Molin, 1861
- Quilonia Lane, 1914
