= Oxfendazole =

Antiparasitic drug

Clinical data
- Trade names: Synanthic, others
- AHFS/Drugs.com: International Drug Names
- ATCvet code: QP52AC02 (WHO)

Identifiers
- IUPAC name: methyl N-[6-(benzenesulfinyl)-1H-1,3-benzodiazol-2-yl]carbamate
- CAS Number: 53716-50-0
- PubChem CID: 40854
- ChemSpider: 37316
- UNII: OMP2H17F9E
- ChEMBL: ChEMBL42442
- CompTox Dashboard (EPA): DTXSID9044112
- ECHA InfoCard: 100.053.358

Chemical and physical data
- Formula: C_{15}H_{13}N_{3}O_{3}S
- Molar mass: 315.35 g·mol^{−1}
- 3D model (JSmol): Interactive image
- SMILES: COC(=O)Nc1nc2ccc(S(=O)c3ccccc3)cc2[nH]1
- InChI: InChI=1S/C15H13N3O3S/c1-21-15(19)18-14-16-12-8-7-11(9-13(12)17-14)22(20)10-5-3-2-4-6-10/h2-9H,1H3,(H2,16,17,18,19); Key:BEZZFPOZAYTVHN-UHFFFAOYSA-N

Oxfendazole is a broad-spectrum benzimidazole anthelmintic. Its main use is for protecting livestock against roundworms, strongyles, and pinworms. Oxfendazole is the sulfoxide metabolite of fenbendazole. Like mebendazole, oxfendazole inhibits tubulin polymerization.

Oxfendazole is an anthelmintic (wormer) compound used in veterinary practice. It comes under the chemical class of the benzimidazoles. This drug is rarely used in horses, goats, sheep, and cattle. It is very scarcely applied on dogs and cats. The drug for livestock is mostly available in the form of pills, tablets, drenches, bolus, etc. They are meant for oral consumption. Several drenches are allowed for intraruminal injection in some of the countries. Few countries also prefer injectables and pour-ons. For pet dogs, the drug is available in the form of drenches.

== Efficacy ==
Both oxfendazole and fenbendazole are efficacious against gastrointestinal lungworms and roundworms of livestock, adults, and L4-larvae of the significant species for example, of the genera Bunostomum, Haemonchus, Ostertagia, Oesophagostomum, Nematodirus, Teladorsagia, Cooperia, Trichostrongylus, Dictyocaulus, Trichuris, etc., including against arrested larvae of some of the species. They are even highly efficient against majority of the tapeworms commonly found in livestock. This drug works effectively against the main parasitic roundworms and tapeworms of dogs and cats.

The drug offers a small residual effect in ruminants unless and otherwise it is delivered by using a slow-release device. This essentially means that on a single administration, it will help in killing the parasites that are present in the host during the time of treatment and also prevent against reinfestations for some more days, but not weeks or months. The drug is not effective against flukes and external parasites at therapeutic doses.

== Adverse effects ==
Since the toxicity of oxfendazole is quite low, it is generally well tolerated by most species. High oral doses can cause intoxication, though, resulting in loss of appetite, diarrhea, fever, cramps, nausea and vomiting, convulsions, hepatic and epicardial hemorrhage, allergic reactions, etc. Due to lack of research, use of oxfendazole in pregnant mares and bitches is not recommended, nor are oxfendazole tablets to treat dogs or cats. A registered veterinarian must authorize the use of oxfendazole in any species.

== Brand names ==
Oxfendazole is sold under brand names of Synanthic (suspension), Benzelmin (paste), and Anthelcide EQ (paste).
