= Ostertagia ostertagi =

Scientific classification
- Kingdom: Animalia
- Phylum: Nematoda
- Class: Chromadorea
- Order: Rhabditida
- Family: Trichostrongylidae
- Genus: Ostertagia
- Species: O. ostertagi

Binomial name
- Ostertagia ostertagi (Stiles, 1892)

Species of roundworm

Ostertagia ostertagi, commonly known as the medium stomach worm or brown stomach worm, is a parasitic nematode (round worm) of cattle. O. ostertagi can also be found to a lesser extent in sheep, goats, wild ruminants, and horses. It causes ostertagiosis, which is potentially fatal in cattle. It is found worldwide and is economically important to cattle industries, particularly those found in temperate climates.

The abomasal nematode O. ostertagi is a clade V nematode of the order Strongylida, the family Trichostrongylidae and genus Ostertagia. Ransom first described the genus Ostertagia in 1907, which currently contains approximately 15 species. All species of the genus Ostertagia infect domestic or wild ruminants. These species form a large and complex group, the taxonomy of which has not been fully elucidated.

== Life cycle ==
O. ostertagi has a life cycle which consists of two stages: the free-living, pre-parasitic stage and the parasitic stage in the host (e.g. cattle). Eggs from mature females in the abomasum are passed in the faeces. These eggs hatch in the faeces to first-stage larvae (L1). The L1 larvae grow and moult to second-stage larvae (L2), which then moult to become the infective third-stage larvae (L3). The L3s retain the cuticle from the second stage (L2) as a protective sheath, and can survive for long periods within the faeces. The time taken to develop into infective larvae is dependent on favourable stimuli such as temperature (approximately 25–27 °C or 77–81 °F) and humidity. Typically, development takes 10 days to 2 weeks.

The parasitic stage of the life cycle begins when warm moist conditions cause the L3 larvae to migrate onto herbage surrounding the fecal pat, which are ingested during grazing. In the host's rumen, the L3 larvae shed their protective sheath and pass into the abomasum, where they penetrate the gastric glands. After exsheathment and penetration into the gastric glands the L3 moult into L4 and subsequently to L5 larvae. The young adult worms then emerge from the gastric glands and continue their maturation on the mucosal surface of the abomasum. Once fully mature, sexual reproduction begins and eggs are produced, thus completing the life cycle.

The normal prepatent period for O. ostertagi is 21 days. However, under certain circumstances, ingested L3 larvae can suspend their maturation and become dormant as inhibited L4 larvae inside the gastric glands. This arrested development is called hypobiosis, and can last for up to six or seven months. Studies suggest that the inhibition process in O. ostertagi depends on the weather conditions to which the infective L3 larvae are exposed on pasture, and the length of time that L3 larvae spend on pasture. In temperate regions of the northern hemisphere, hypobiosis occurs in autumn and early winter, but in the southern hemisphere there is evidence that this phenomenon occurs in spring and early summer.

== Morphology ==
O. ostertagi adults are slender reddish-brown worms. Adult males are 6–7 mm (0.24–0.28 in) long, adult females 8–11 mm (0.31–0.43 in) long, and the eggs 70–86 μm (0.0028–0.0034 in) long. Identification of adult medium stomach worms is based on the structure of the bursa, genital cone, and spicules in males and on the dimensions of the oesophageal valve and the configuration of the synlophe in males and females. The cuticle in the anterior region is striated transversely whereas the rest of the body is unstriated and bears around 36 longitudinal ridges. The Ostertaginae are characterized by a reduced buccal capsule and square head, and well-developed copulatory bursa in the male. The genital cone ventrally bears two small slender papillae and dorsally bears two long slender papillae surrounded by an accessory bursal membrane. The lateral rays of the copulatory bursa are in a pattern of 2-1-2 or 2-2-1 pattern. The key to morphologically identifying O. ostertagi males is a prominent proconus and the remainder of the genital cone is not prominent. The spicules are of equal length and shape, tapering towards the distal end. The key to morphologically identifying O. ostertagi females is the lateral synlophe with one pair of ridges ending next to the lateral ridge between cervical papilla and the posterior end of the oesophagus. The cervical papillae are prominent and thornlike. A large number of surface cuticular ridges (synlophe) are perpendicular to the surface.

The infective L3 larvae of O. ostertagi can also be identified morphologically. The L3 will have an external sheath. The larva head is rounded and can be distinguished from Cooperia spp. as it lacks the two refractive bodies in the head that is seen in this species. The tail of the larvae within the sheath is rounded and the body contains 16 intestinal cells. The external sheath of the O. ostertagi larvae also has a much blunter tip then that of Copperia spp. or Haemonchus placei. O. ostertagi can also be distinguished from the L3 larvae of Trichostrongylus spp. as it has a much longer sheath tail extension.

== Molecular biology ==
The genome size estimate for O. ostertagi is ~58 MB, based on T. circumcincta (Ostertagia circumcincta), whose genome is 58.6 MB and on H. contortus at 52 MB, based on flow cytometry. There are 7,006 identified expressed sequenced tags (ESTs), representing 2,564 genes.

== Disease ==
Clinical ostertagiosis normally occurs in first grazing season calves but can affect mature animals. Subclinical infection results in reduced weight gain and growth rate, reduced reproductive efficiency and reduced milk production. The primary clinical symptom of fulminant bovine ostertagiosis is watery diarrhoea and is usually accompanied by reduced appetite. Infected animals are characterised by dull, rough coats and hindquarters soiled with faeces as a result of the profuse diarrhoea. Cattle are frequently co-infected with many gastrointestinal nematodes including species of the following genera: Ostertagia, Haemonchus, Bunostomum, Oesophagostomum, Trichuris, Trichostrongylus, Cooperia, and Nematodirus. The clinical signs between these species of nematodes are difficult to distinguish from each other, and are often referred to as a syndrome called parasitic gastroenteritis. Clinical ostertagiosis can be observed under two sets of circumstances referred to as type I and type II disease.

=== Type I disease ===
Type I disease occurs in young cattle grazing on pastures for their first time during the period of high pasture contamination. This syndrome usually occurs in the summer and fall months in the Northern hemisphere and during the winter and spring months in the Southern hemisphere. Infective larvae are ingested daily by the young stock on pasture. The pathological and clinical signs are due to the direct development of large numbers of L3 larvae to adult worms over a relatively short period of time (approximately 3 weeks) in young animals with an immune system naïve to Ostertagia infections. The young adult worms then break out of the gastric glands, causing substantial damage to the abomasal wall. Mild cases result in reduced growth or production and severe cases can result in fulminating disease characterized by profuse watery diarrhoea, rapid weight loss, submandibular oedema ("bottle jaw"), anemia and death.

=== Type II disease ===
Type II disease can occur in yearlings and older cattle. It is the result of arrested L4s resuming their development to immature adults and leaving the gastric glands. This can occur weeks or months after being ingested as L3s and is a consequence of favourable environmental conditions. The larvae will then resume maturation gradually or in bursts. The clinical signs are identical to type I disease and the severity depends on the magnitude of the eruptions. In the Northern hemisphere type II disease is often seen in the early spring, and in the fall in the Southern hemisphere.

== Pathology ==
Worms can readily be seen and identified in the abomasum, and small petechiae (blood spots) may be visible where the worms have been feeding. The most characteristic lesions of Ostertagia infections are multiple small, white, raised umbilicated nodules 1–2 mm in diameter. These may be discrete, but in heavy infections they tend to coalesce and give rise to a "cobblestone" or "morocco leather" appearance. Nodules are most marked in the fundus region but may cover the entire abomasal mucosa. In severe cases, edema may extend over the abomasum and into the small intestine and omentum.

When examined histologically, abomasal gastric glands contain larvae in varying stages of development, which results in hyperplasia and distention of the glands, and flattening of the glandular epithelium. Affected glands lack differentiated acid-producing parietal and pepsinogen producing chief cells. Type I and type II disease is often differentiated by the presence of increased numbers of globule leucocytes, eosinophils and focal aggregates of lymphoplasmocytic cells in animals with type II disease.

=== Pathophysiology ===
Consequences of the damage done to the gastric gland by O. ostertagi include:

1. Pepsinogen is not activated to its active form, pepsin, due to decreased acid production caused by the loss of parietal cell function, resulting in an increase in abomasal pH.
2. Due to increased abomasal pH, proteins are not denatured and digested. Dietary energy and protein, which would otherwise be used for growth, must be used to replace these proteins. Weight loss is the result.
3. Also due to the increased abomasal pH, there is an increase in the number of bacteria in the abomasum, which can contribute to the diarrhoea seen in clinical cases.
4. Movement of serum proteins, particularly albumin from the circulating blood into the abomasal lumen due to compromised intracellular junctions occur. The increased albumin decreases fluid absorption by the gut, causing diarrhoea. The loss of albumin also causes body fluids to collect in lower parts of the body such as under the jaw (bottle jaw) or in the abdomen (ascites).
5. The increased abomasal pH also stimulates the production of gastrin and thus hypergastrinemia, which is closely associated with the inappetence. This parasite-associated drop in intake has been shown to be largely responsible for impaired weight gain.

=== Immune response and host defence ===
Gastrointestinal nematodes may elicit a variety of host immune responses depending on the initial immune status of the host, parasite species, and environmental conditions. The body has several physical defense mechanisms against parasites including the continual sloughing of the gut epithelium to prevent parasite attachment. However, once an infection has occurred, the host's immune system attempts to limit the damage caused by the worm. Apart from the importance of the extrinsic factors of weather, climate and grazing management, the immune status of cattle is perhaps the most significant of all host factors influencing infection with O. ostertagi. Unlike other common gastrointestinal nematodes of cattle, who are subject to a quick host immune response after relatively short periods of exposure and immune system memory, a protective host immune response against O. ostertagi requires far longer periods of exposure and is not always permanent. The failure to respond quickly to Ostertagia may be a result of the suggested immunosuppression or impairment of antibody and cellular responses. O. ostertagi has been shown to induce cytokines and T-cells in the adaptive immune response in cattle, and recent advances have been made to produce suitable vaccines targeting adult stage Ostertagia. The major limitations to reducing parasitic load using vaccines is the complex and dynamic host-parasite interaction that is unique to each species of host and parasite, which is often influenced by several environmental factors.

== Diagnosis ==
The presence of O. ostertagi within a host may be inferred by several methods. Faecal worm egg counts (FECs) in particular (preferably with speciation by way of larval culture and differentiation), and total worm counts are the tests most commonly employed in the diagnosis of helminth infections in ruminants. The direct counting of nematode eggs in feces is the method of choice for yearling animals, whereas in adult animals it may yield high variability due to a cow's immunity and low egg output. Other biochemical methods have been developed to help more accurately diagnose O. ostertagi parasitism. These include the determination of specific anti-parasite antibodies in milk. Enzyme-linked immunosorbent assays (ELISAs) have been used as a diagnostic tool to quantify the impact of gastrointestinal nematodes in dairy cattle by measuring antibodies in milk. Higher levels of antibodies measured by ELISA methods, referred to as optical density ratios (ODRs), are associated with decreased milk production in dairy cattle. Similar results have been established in the dairy industry between increased ODR and negative effects on health, body weight and reproductive measures Blood pepsinogen concentration, which increases with abomasal mucosa injury has also been used to diagnose ostertagiosis. The analysis of sera for increased plasma pepsinogen levels is a useful diagnostic aid. Generally, increased levels of pepsinogen activity (tyrosine levels >3 IU) are associated with clinical abomasal parasitism. The serum pepsinogen assay could be replaced by the antibody ELISA assay for first-season grazing (FSG) calves.

== Treatment and control strategies ==
There are several classes of anthelmintic drugs used to control gastrointestinal nematodes in livestock. The most common in the cattle industry are macrocyclic lactones, which include ivermectin and eprinomectin, benzimidazoles, and imidazothiazoles are also used to a lesser extent. Due to routine, blanket herd treatment, there is widespread resistance to anthelmintic drugs in warm climates in sheep, and increasing evidence of resistance in cattle in temperate climates. As a consequence, livestock industries will have to adapt husbandry practices to manage internal parasites. This may include a variety of combinations of pasture rotations, flexible stocking rates, and genetic selection. Several new control methods are also being researched including vaccines, nematode-trapping fungi, and tannins in feed.

=== Drench resistance ===
Given the importance of effective parasite control, there is heightened concern over reduced anthelmintic efficacy. There is a broad range of current literature reporting developing resistance of O. ostertagi to all major classes of anthelmintic worldwide including the United States, New Zealand, Brazil, Argentina, and the UK. As recently as January 2016, O. ostertagi anthelmintic resistance was reported to all three major drug classes on 20 dairy farms in Southern Australia The two most widely accepted anthelmintic resistance diagnosis methods for O. ostertagi are in vivo methods: the fecal egg count reduction test (FECRT) and the controlled efficacy test (CET). The World Association for the Advancement of Veterinary Parasitology (WAAVP) has provided guidelines on the detection of anthelmintic resistance.
