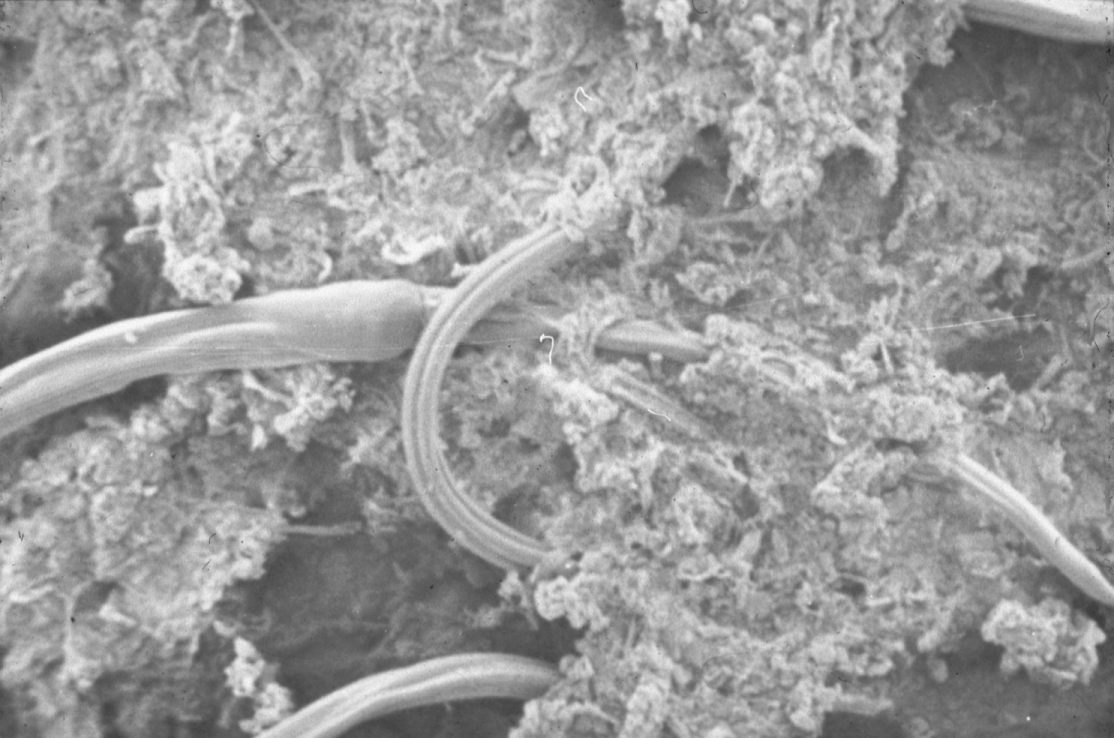
- Scanning electron micrograph

Scientific classification
- Kingdom: Animalia
- Phylum: Nematoda
- Class: Chromadorea
- Order: Rhabditida
- Family: Trichostrongylidae
- Genus: Teladorsagia
- Species: T. circumcincta

Binomial name
- Teladorsagia circumcincta (Stadelman, 1894)

Synonyms
- Ostertagia circumcincta

= Teladorsagia circumcincta =

Species of roundworm

Teladorsagia circumcincta is a nematode that is one of the most important parasites of sheep and goats. It was previously known as Ostertagia circumcincta and is colloquially known as the brown stomach worm. It is common in cool, temperate areas, such as south-eastern and south-western Australia and the United Kingdom. There is considerable variation among lambs and kids in susceptibility to infection. Much of the variation is genetic and influences the immune response. The parasite induces a type I hypersensitivity response which is responsible for the relative protein deficiency which is characteristic of severely infected animals. There are mechanistic mathematical models which can predict the course of infection. There are a variety of ways to control the infection and a combination of control measures is likely to provide the most effective and sustainable control.

== Taxonomy ==
Teladorsagia is a member of the subfamily Ostertagiiniae in the family Trichostrongylidae and the superfamily Trichostrongyloidea. Ostertagia, Haemonchus and Graphidium are closely related taxa that are usually assigned to separate subfamilies. Teladorsagia davtiani and Teladorsagia trifurcata are probably phenotypic variants (morphotypes).

== Morphology ==
Adults are slender with a short buccal cavity and are ruddy brown in colour. The average worm size varies considerably among sheep. Females range in size from 0.6 to 1.2 cm with males typically about 20% smaller.

== Life cycle ==
The life cycle is relatively simple. Male and female adults breed on the abomasal surface. Eggs are passed in the faeces and develop through first (L1), second (L2) and third stage larvae (L3). Third stage larvae are unable to feed and are the infective stage. Following ingestion, third-stage larvae rapidly moult within 48 hours into fourth stage larvae (L4) which develop in the gastric glands. About 8 days after infection, the young adults emerge from the gastric glands, mature and breed. The prepatent period can be as short as 12 days. The number of eggs in the uterus of mature females can vary from less than 10 to more than 60 and is heavily dependent on the host immune response. The number of eggs produced per day by an adult female worm has been estimated as ranging from 0 to approximately 350, with longer females laying more eggs.

== Epidemiology ==
It is responsible for considerable economic losses in sheep. It is believed to also cause severe losses in goats although there is a relative dearth of research in this species. In most countries, infection with third-stage larvae resumes in the spring and is triggered by the production of large numbers of eggs by periparturient females. The key trigger appears to be a relative protein deficiency in the ewe and the periparturient rise may be prevented by feeding supplementary protein. In the stereotypical pattern, egg production (assessed by faecal egg counts in the lambs) rises till midsummer then declines. The development of free-living nematodes is influenced by temperature and moisture and there is considerable variation within and among years in the number of infective larvae available for ingestion. Consequently, the pattern of egg production during the year also varies among years. The number of infective larvae gradually dies down at the end of the grazing season when grass growth also declines. The end of the season varies among countries depending upon their climate and is also likely to vary from year to year within countries depending upon local weather but is poorly documented. For example, in Scotland, the season usually ends about late October.

There is considerable variation among animals in faecal egg counts and much of this variation is genetic in origin. The sources of variation are dynamic and their relative importance changes over the course of the year. Other sources of variation, apart from inherited effects include maternal and common environmental effects and effects specific to each individual, including variation in intake and non-additive genetic effects. The gender of the lamb, type of birth (single or twin), date of birth and intensity of early exposure to nematode infection have relatively minor but still important effects. The inevitable variation between the observed count and the true faecal egg count also contributes to the observed variation. Both the natural history of infection and the sources of variation among individuals are relatively well understood for T. circumcincta compared to most parasites.

== Clinical signs and diagnosis ==
Essentially all grazing animals are exposed to infection and most animals will carry some nematodes either as adults or arrested early fourth-stage larvae or both. For disease control, the aim is not to diagnose infection but to identify animals or flocks that are sufficiently heavily infected to show reduced production, decreased animal welfare or parasitic gastroenteritis. Heavily infected animals are relatively protein deficient. Clinical signs include reduced appetite, poor growth performance, weight loss and intermittent diarrhoea. In addition to clinical signs, faecal egg counts and the timing of infection are used to identify severely affected animals. However, lambs with very high numbers of worms produce very few eggs; there are strong density-dependent effects of worm number on egg production.

== Genetics ==
The heritability of a trait in the narrow sense is the proportion of inherited variation divided by the total variation. It determines the response to selection. Faecal egg count is widely used to identify and select animals that are relatively resistant to nematode infection. Selection is most advanced in Australia and New Zealand where the dominant nematodes are Haemonchus contortus or a mixture of T. circumcincta and Trichostrongylus colubriformis.

For naturally infected Scottish Blackface lambs grazing fields contaminated with predominantly T. circumcincta eggs, the heritability of faecal egg count was not significantly different from zero for the first two months after birth then rose to approximately 0.3 at the end of the grazing season. Similar heritability estimates were obtained for a flock of Texel sheep. This heritability is similar to the heritability of growth rate in beef cattle and milk production in dairy cattle and indicates the feasibility of selective breeding for resistance to natural predominantly T. circumcincta infection.

Genetic variation in faecal egg count in lambs following natural infection is predominantly due to genetic variation influencing worm size and fecundity rather than worm establishment and survival or larval inhibition. Indeed, the heritability of adult female worm size, which is closely related to fecundity, has been estimated at 0.6 whereas the heritability of worm number was only 0.14. The high heritability of worm size is one of the highest heritabilities known for a fitness related trait.

There has been a lot of effort devoted to identifying the causal polymorphisms that underlie resistance to infection. Two genomic regions in particular have shown associations in a number of different studies: the DRB1 locus of the major histocompatibility complex and the interferon gamma locus. Linkage disequilibrium in sheep is quite high compared to humans and the causative loci need not be in these regions but are probably in or around these regions. There are a number of regions which have shown suggestive (nearly but not quite statistically significant) associations in more than one study and some of these are probably harbouring causal polymorphisms for nematode resistance.

Many of the putative candidate genes influence the immune response and genetic variation seems to predominantly influence immune responsiveness to infection. Although there are clues that other mechanisms may also contribute to genetic variation.

== Immune responsiveness ==
There are two major manifestations of resistance to T. circumcincta: the regulation of worm growth and the control of worm establishment and survival. The regulation of adult worm size and fecundity is strongly and consistently associated with IgA activity especially against fourth-stage larvae. This effect is so strong and consistent that it is likely causal because there is no other immunological mechanism that is so strongly associated with IgA activity. Eosinophil number is also associated with worm length and fecundity and it is likely that eosinophils and IgA interact to influence worm growth and fecundity. Eosinophils have been implicated in resistance to infection to Haemonchus contortus. Eosinophils play a much weaker role in resistance of mice to parasitic infections but this may reflect the fact that mice eosinophils lack the IgA receptor.

The other major mechanism of resistance to T. circumcincta is the IgE and mast cell mediated control of worm establishment and survival. Again, this association is so strong and consistent that it is likely to be causal rather than acting as a marker for some other response. IgE activity against third-stage larvae seems to be most important. The number of molecules recognised by IgE seems to be relatively small; two-dimensional Western blotting identified only 9 molecules, although there is evidence for at least two other allergens. For comparison, 155 molecules were recognised by IgA on third-stage larvae.

== Pathology ==
The immune response appears to be responsible for much of the pathology following nematode infection. Immune suppression abolishes many of the clinical signs.

Infection causes a relative protein deficiency that leads to reduced weight gain or even weight loss. This due in part to a reduction in appetite. There is also a loss in digestive efficiency. Lesions in the epithelial barrier allow a loss of protein and in addition protein is diverted to tissue repair and immune and inflammatory processes. Protein supplementation of the diet can prevent the appearance of clinical signs which argues strongly that pathogenesis is a consequence of the relative protein deficiency.

Following infection, there is a breakdown of the mucosal barrier which is a consequence of mast cell degranulation releasing a serine protease mast cell protease II that digests occludin and claudin in the tight junctions between epithelial cells. Many of the pathological responses such as epithelial hyperplasia, increased pH in the abomasum, pepsinogenaemia and lack of appetite are a consequence of repair processes triggered by the binding of epithelial growth factor in saliva to receptors on the internal surface of epithelial cells. Prolonged and sustained infection subverts the repair process into a pathogenic mechanism. Mixed infections of abomasal and intestinal species are more pathogenic than monospecific infections, at least in cattle. A plausible explanation is that infection in the small intestine inhibits reabsorption of proteins lost in the abomasum.

== Mathematical modelling ==
A number of groups have modelled the infection process ranging from descriptive to semi-mechanistic to almost entirely mechanistic models. Initially models were mainly of academic interest but more and more models are playing a useful role in planning experiments. Models can test the hypotheses arising from natural and deliberate infections; for example whether genomic approaches can be used to identify animals that do not require anthelmintic treatment and suggest potential strategies for the control of infections.

== Infection control ==
The methods to control nematode infection in livestock can be grouped into 6 categories: anthelmintic treatment, grazing management, biological control, nutritional supplementation, vaccination and genetic resistance. Each method has its advantages and disadvantages.

Anthelmintic treatment usually involves treatment with one or more of five classes of broad spectrum drugs. drugs: benzimidazoles, levamisole, macrocyclic lactones, amino acetonitrile derivatives and spiroindoles. Narrow spectrum drugs are also available. Drug formulations vary among countries and only some countries allow combinations of drugs to be used. Anthelmintic treatment is cheap, simple and effective but is threatened by the development of drug resistance in parasite populations. There are a number of strategies to mitigate the development of drug resistance including the use of combinations to delay the development of drug resistance in parasite populations. Drugs have been so cheap and effective that it was usually easier and cheaper to treat all animals in a population. However, not all individuals require treatment and best practice is now to target treatment on selected animals to delay the development of drug resistance. The criteria to decide which animals are to be treated and the size of the untreated population are matters of active research.

Grazing management usually aims to increase the supply of grass to grazing livestock but can also reduce the numbers of infective nematode available to infect sheep. The options include adjusting the stocking density, rotational grazing, the use of less infected pastures, alternating the use of pasture between animals and plants, between different species of animals or between young animals and older stock. Grazing management is cheap, simple and at least some elements are widely used but is seldom very effective in isolation and can be impractical.

Biological control with spores of the fungus Duddingtonia flagrans has recently been licensed in Australia and can be very effective but requires regular, possibly daily, feeding.

Nutritional supplementation can eliminate clinical signs but can be very expensive. Supplementation with protein or non-protein nitrogen sources appear more important than supplementation with energy sources. Non-protein sources such as urea are effective and relatively cheap but great care would be needed to avoid toxicity with high doses.

There is currently no completely reliable vaccine but great progress is being made. In general, it is relatively easy to protect older animal but very difficult to protect younger animals.

Genetic resistance includes the use of relatively resistant breeds such as the Texel, cross-breeding and selective breeding. Selective breeding can be very effective and almost completely eliminate the need for anthelmintic treatment but requires specialist expertise.

Most experts feel that a combination of control methods will be more effective and sustainable. However, the most effective combination of control methods may vary from farm to farm and require specialist expertise to design and implement.
