= Moxidectin =

Chemical compound

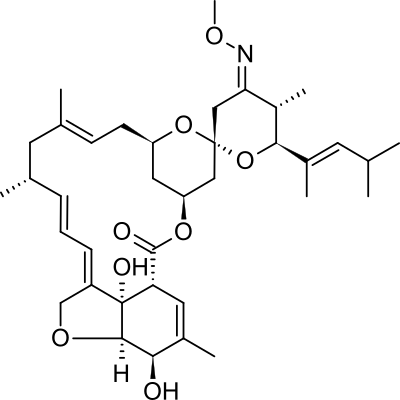

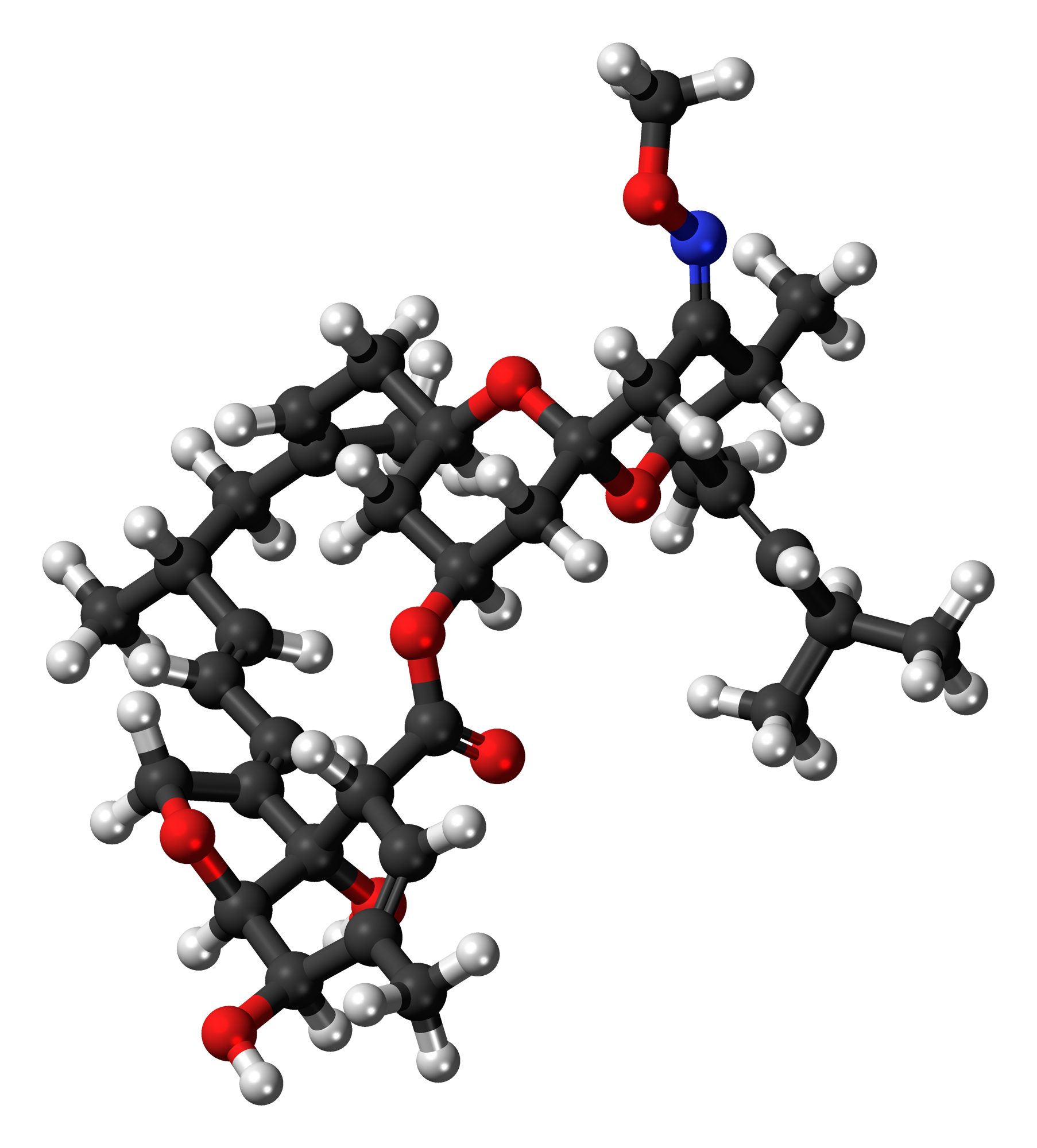

Clinical data
- Trade names: Cydectin, Equest, ProHeart, Quest.
- Other names: CL 301,423; milbemycin B.
- AHFS/Drugs.com: International Drug Names
- Routes of administration: By mouth, topical, subcutaneous
- ATC code: P02CX03 (WHO) QP54AB02 (WHO), QP54AB52 (WHO)

Legal status
- Legal status: CA: ℞-only; US: ℞-only

Identifiers
- IUPAC name: (10E,14E,16E,22Z)-(1R,4S,5′S,6R,6′S,8R,13R,20R,21R,24S)-6′-
- CAS Number: 113507-06-5
- PubChem CID: 9832912
- DrugBank: DB11431
- ChemSpider: 16736424
- UNII: NGU5H31YO9
- KEGG: D05084
- CompTox Dashboard (EPA): DTXSID5037577
- ECHA InfoCard: 100.163.046

Chemical and physical data
- Formula: C_{37}H_{53}NO_{8}
- Molar mass: 639.830 g·mol^{−1}
- 3D model (JSmol): Interactive image
- SMILES: CC(C)\C=C(/C)[C@H]5O[C@@]2(C[C@H]1OC(=O)[C@@H]3/C=C(/C)[C@@H](O)[C@H]4OC/C(=C\C=C\[C@H](C)CC(\C)=C\C[C@H](C1)O2)[C@@]34O)C\C(=N\OC)[C@@H]5C
- InChI: InChI=1S/C37H53NO8/c1-21(2)14-25(6)33-26(7)31(38-42-8)19-36(46-33)18-29-17-28(45-36)13-12-23(4)15-22(3)10-9-11-27-20-43-34-32(39)24(5)16-30(35(40)44-29)37(27,34)41/h9-12,14,16,21-22,26,28-30,32-34,39,41H,13,15,17-20H2,1-8H3/b10-9+,23-12+,25-14+,27-11+,38-31-/t22-,26-,28+,29-,30-,32+,33+,34+,36-,37+/m0/s1; Key:YZBLFMPOMVTDJY-CBYMMZEQSA-N

Moxidectin is an anthelmintic drug used in animals to prevent or control parasitic worms (helminths), such as heartworm and intestinal worms, in dogs, cats, horses, cattle, sheep and wombats. Moxidectin kills some of the most common internal and external parasites by selectively binding to a parasite's glutamate-gated chloride ion channels. These channels are vital to the function of invertebrate nerve and muscle cells; when moxidectin binds to the channels, it disrupts neurotransmission, resulting in paralysis and death of the parasite.

Moxidectin is a therapeutic alternative on the World Health Organization's List of Essential Medicines.

== Medical uses ==
Moxidectin was approved for onchocerciasis (river-blindness) in 2018 for people over the age of 11 in the United States based on two studies. There is a need for additional trials, with long-term follow-up, to assess whether moxidectin is safe and effective for treatment of nematode infection in children and women of childbearing potential. Moxidectin is predicted to be helpful to achieve elimination goals of this disease.

- Dogs: Prevention of heartworm. In combination with imidacloprid to treat sarcoptic mange.
- Horses: Treatment of parasites including Strongylus vulgaris, and stomach bots such as Gasterophilus intestinalis.
- Cattle: Treatment of parasites such as the gastrointestinal nematode Ostertagia ostertagi, and the lungworm Dictyocaulus viviparus.
- Sheep: Treatment of the nematodes Teladorsagia circumcincta and Haemonchus contortus.

Nematodes can develop cross-resistance between moxidectin and other similar parasiticides, such as ivermectin, doramectin and abamectin. The ways in which the parasites evolve resistance to this drug include mutations in glutamate-gated chloride channel genes, GABA-R genes, or increased expression of p-glycoprotein, which is a transmembrane drug efflux pump. Allele frequency changes corresponding to resistance to moxidectin and/or other macrocyclic lactone-class drugs have been observed in the glutamate-gated chloride channel α-subunit gene of Haemonchus contortus and Cooperia oncophora, as well as in the H. contortus genes coding for p-glycoprotein and the GABA-R gene.

Moxidectin is being evaluated as a treatment to eradicate scabies in humans, especially when resistant to other treatments.

== Adverse effects ==
Studies of moxidectin show the side effects vary by animal and may be affected by the product's formulation, application method and dosage.. It is however regarded as relatively safe.

An overdose of moxidectin enhances the effect of gamma-aminobutyric acid (GABA) in the central nervous system. In horses, overdose may lead to depression, drooping of the lower lip, tremor, lack of coordination when moving (ataxia), decreased rate of breathing (respiratory rate), stupor and coma.

If a dog licks moxidectin from the skin which was applied as a "spot-on" (topical) treatment, this has the same effect as an overdose, and may cause vomiting, salivation and neurological signs such as ataxia, tremor, and nystagmus. Some Collie dogs can tolerate moxidectin, but other individuals are sensitive and upon ingestion, experience vomiting, salivation or transient neurological signs.

== Pharmacology ==
Moxidectin is very lipophilic, which causes it to have a high volume of distribution. Moxidectin concentrates in the animal's adipose tissue, from where it is released for up to two months following administration.

In goats, the oral bioavailability of moxidectin is 2.7 times lower, and the half-life is 1.8 times shorter than in sheep.

== Chemistry ==
Moxidectin, a macrocyclic lactone of the milbemycin class, is a semisynthetic derivative of nemadectin, which is a fermentation product of the bacterium Streptomyces cyanogriseus subsp. noncyanogenus.

== History ==
In the late 1980s, an American Cyanamid Company agronomist discovered the Streptomyces bacteria from which moxidectin is derived in a soil sample from Australia. Two companies filed patents for moxidectin: Glaxo Group and the American Cyanamid Company; in 1988, all patents were transferred to American Cyanamid. In 1990, the first moxidectin product was sold in Argentina.

For human use, moxidectin was approved by the United States Food and Drug Administration in June 2018, for the treatment of onchocerciasis in adults and adolescents aged 12 years of age and older. This is the first human approval worldwide. The license holder is the nonprofit biopharmaceutical company Medicines Development for Global Health.
