= Cooperia =

Cooperia is the scientific name of two genera of organisms and may refer to:

- Cooperia (nematode), a genus of nematodes in the family Cooperiidae, including the species Cooperia oncophora
- Cooperia (plant), a genus of plants in the family Amaryllidaceae, now considered a synonym of Zephyranthes
