= Doramectin =

Chemical compound

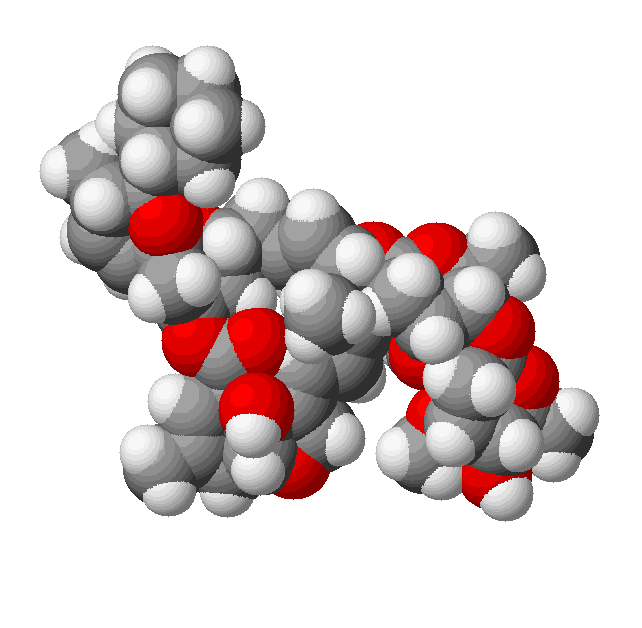

Clinical data
- Trade names: Dectomax, others
- Other names: 25-cyclohexylavermectin B1, 25-cyclohexyl-25-de(l-methylpropyl)avermectin B1a, 25-cyclohexyl-5-O-demethyl-25-de(l-methylpropyl)avermectin A1a
- AHFS/Drugs.com: International Drug Names
- License data: US DailyMed: Doramectin
- Routes of administration: Subcutaneous, intramuscular, topical
- ATCvet code: QP54AA03 (WHO)

Legal status
- Legal status: US: OTC for animals

Identifiers
- IUPAC name: (1'R,2S,4'S,5S,6R,8'R,10'E,12'R,13'S,14'E,20'R,21'R,24'S)-6-cyclohexyl-21',24'-dihydroxy-12'-{[(2R,4S,5S,6S)-5-{[(2S,4S,5S,6S)-5-hydroxy-4-methoxy-6-methyloxan-2-yl]oxy}-4-methoxy-6-methyloxan-2-yl]oxy}-5,11',13',22'-tetramethyl-5,6-dihydro-3',7',19'-trioxaspiro[pyran-2,6'-tetracyclo[15.6.1.1^{4,8}.0^{20,24}]pentacosane]-10',14',16',22'-tetraen-2'-one
- CAS Number: 117704-25-3
- PubChem CID: 9832750
- ChemSpider: 8008478
- UNII: KGD7A54H5P
- KEGG: D01129
- CompTox Dashboard (EPA): DTXSID9048982
- ECHA InfoCard: 100.123.125

Chemical and physical data
- Formula: C_{50}H_{74}O_{14}
- Molar mass: 899.128 g·mol^{−1}
- InChI: InChI=1S/C50H74O14/c1-27-13-12-16-34-26-57-47-42(51)30(4)21-37(50(34,47)54)48(53)60-36-22-35(63-49(25-36)20-19-29(3)45(64-49)33-14-10-9-11-15-33)18-17-28(2)44(27)61-41-24-39(56-8)46(32(6)59-41)62-40-23-38(55-7)43(52)31(5)58-40/h12-13,16-17,19-21,27,29,31-33,35-47,51-52,54H,9-11,14-15,18,22-26H2,1-8H3/b13-12+,28-17+,34-16+/t27-,29-,31-,32-,35+,36-,37-,38-,39-,40-,41-,42+,43-,44-,45-,46-,47+,49+,50+/m0/s1; Key:QLFZZSKTJWDQOS-YDBLARSUSA-N

Doramectin, sold under the brand name Dectomax among others, is a veterinary medication approved by the US Food and Drug Administration (FDA) for the treatment of parasites such as gastrointestinal roundworms, lungworms, eyeworms, grubs, sucking lice, and mange mites in cattle. It is available as a generic medication. It is available as a combination with levamisole under the brand name Valcor.

It is used for the treatment and control of internal parasitosis (gastrointestinal and pulmonary nematodes), ticks and mange (and other ectoparasites). Doramectin is a derivative of avermectin. Similarly to other drugs of this family, it is produced by fermentation by selected strains of Streptomyces avermitilis followed by chemical modification. Its spectrum includes: Haemonchus, Ostertagia, Trichostrongylus, Cooperia, and Oesophagostomum species and Dictyocaulus viviparus, Dermatobia hominis, Boophilus microplus, and Psoroptes bovis, among many other internal and external parasites. It is available as an injection and as a topical solution.

== Society and culture ==
=== Legal status ===
In November 2024, the FDA approved doramectin (brand name Doracide) for the treatment and control of gastrointestinal roundworms, lungworms, eyeworms, grubs, biting and sucking lice, horn flies, and mange mites in cattle.

=== Brand names ===
Doramectin is marketed under the brand name Doramec L.A. for cattle, sheep, and swine.

Doramectin is available for horses as an oral, flavored, bioadhesive gel under the name Doraquest L.A. Oral Gel. It can be used to control and treat internal parasites as roundworms, lungworms and some external parasites.
