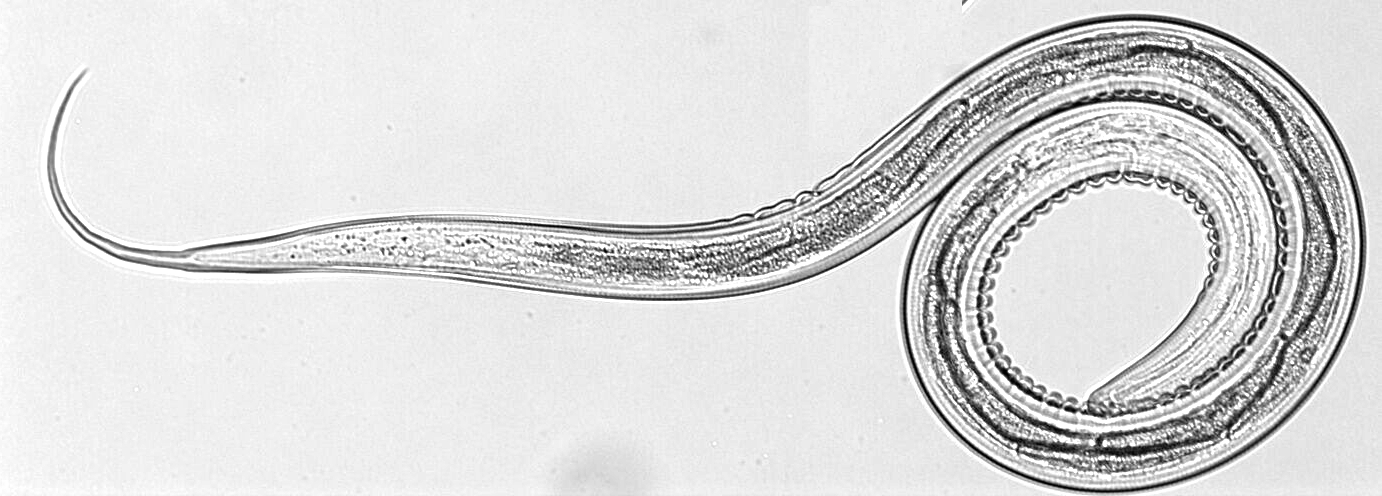
- Cooperia oncophora

Scientific classification
- Domain: Eukaryota
- Kingdom: Animalia
- Phylum: Nematoda
- Class: Chromadorea
- Order: Rhabditida
- Suborder: Strongylida
- Superfamily: Trichostrongyloidea

= Trichostrongyloidea =

Superfamily of roundworms

Trichstrongyloidea is a superfamily of nematodes under the order Strongylida.

Includes genera such as Ostertagia, Teladorsagia, Trichostrongylus, Haemonchus, Cooperia, Nematodirus, Dictyocaulus.
