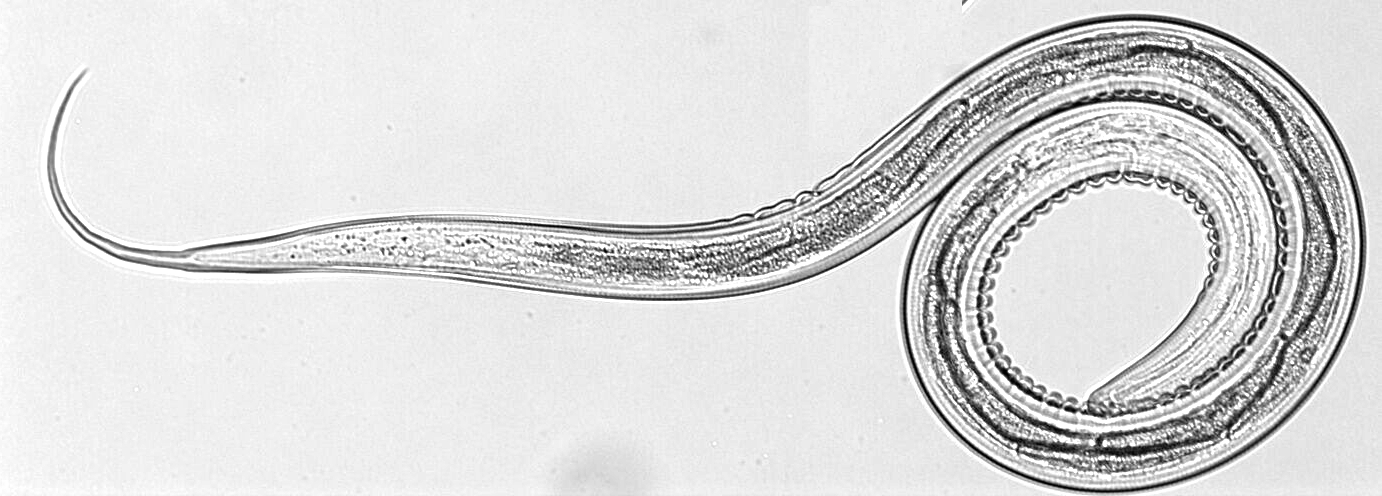
- L3 stage larva of Cooperia oncophora. Courtesy of Russell Avramenko.

Scientific classification
- Domain: Eukaryota
- Kingdom: Animalia
- Phylum: Nematoda
- Class: Chromadorea
- Order: Rhabditida
- Family: Cooperiidae; Skrjabin & Schikhobalova, 1952

Genera
- Chabaudstrongylus Dróżdż, 1967; Cooperia Ransom, 1907; Libyostrongylus Lane, 1923; Paracooperia Travassos, 1935; Paralibyostrongylus Ortlepp, 1939

= Cooperiidae =

Family of roundworms

Cooperiidae is a family of nematodes that are one of the most common intestinal parasitic nematodes in cattle in temperate regions.
