= Trichostrongylus affinis =

Scientific classification
- Domain: Eukaryota
- Kingdom: Animalia
- Phylum: Nematoda
- Class: Chromadorea
- Order: Rhabditida
- Family: Trichostrongylidae
- Genus: Trichostrongylus
- Species: T. affinis

Binomial name
- Trichostrongylus affinis Graybill, 1924

Species of roundworm

Trichostrongylus affinis is a species of parasitic nematode in the genus Trichostrongylus. It primarily infects cottontails (Sylvilagus), but has also been found in the hispid cotton rat (Sigmodon hispidus) and the marsh rice rat (Oryzomys palustris).

== See also ==
- List of parasites of the marsh rice rat

== Literature cited ==
- Kinsella, J.M. 1974. Comparison of helminth parasites of the cotton rat, Sigmodon hispidus, from several habitats in Florida. American Museum Novitates 2540:1–12.
- Kinsella, J.M. 1988. Comparison of helminths of rice rats, Oryzomys palustris, from freshwater and saltwater marshes in Florida. Proceedings of the Helminthological Society of Washington 55(2):275–280.
