= Trichostrongylus sigmodontis =

Scientific classification
- Domain: Eukaryota
- Kingdom: Animalia
- Phylum: Nematoda
- Class: Chromadorea
- Order: Rhabditida
- Family: Trichostrongylidae
- Genus: Trichostrongylus
- Species: T. sigmodontis

Binomial name
- Trichostrongylus sigmodontis Baylis, 1945

Species of roundworm

Trichostrongylus sigmodontis is a species of parasitic nematode in the genus Trichostrongylus. It primarily infects the hispid cotton rat (Sigmodon hispidus), but has also been found in the marsh rice rat (Oryzomys palustris).

== See also ==
- List of parasites of the marsh rice rat

== Literature cited ==
- Kinsella, J.M. 1974. Comparison of helminth parasites of the cotton rat, Sigmodon hispidus, from several habitats in Florida. American Museum Novitates 2540:1–12.
- Kinsella, J.M. 1988. Comparison of helminths of rice rats, Oryzomys palustris, from freshwater and saltwater marshes in Florida. Proceedings of the Helminthological Society of Washington 55(2):275–280.
