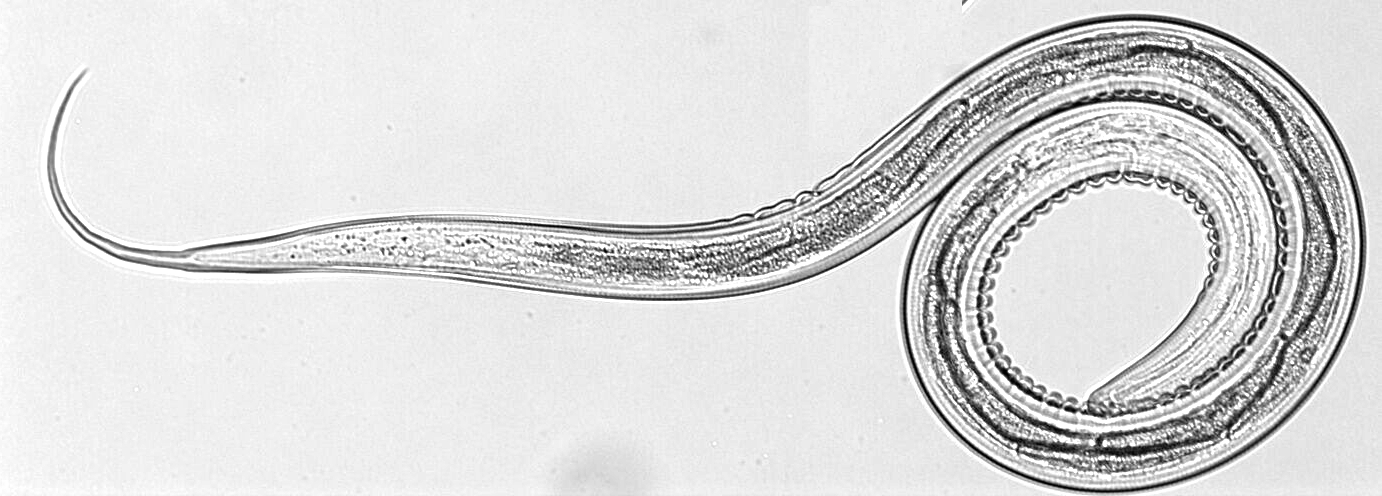
- L3 stage larva of C. oncophora. Courtesy of Russell Avramenko.

Scientific classification
- Kingdom: Animalia
- Phylum: Nematoda
- Class: Chromadorea
- Order: Rhabditida
- Family: Diplogastridae
- Genus: Cooperia
- Species: C. oncophora

Binomial name
- Cooperia oncophora (Railliet, 1898)

= Cooperia oncophora =

Species of roundworm

Cooperia oncophora is one of the most common intestinal parasitic nematodes in cattle in temperate regions. Infections with C. oncophora may result in mild clinical symptoms, but can lead to weight loss and damage of the small intestine, especially when co-infections with other nematodes such as O. ostertagi occur. Infections are usually treated with broad-spectrum anthelmintics such as benzimidazole, but resistance to these drugs has developed in the last decades and is now very common. C. oncophora has a direct life cycle. Infective larvae are ingested by the host. The larvae grow to adults, which reproduce in the small intestines. Eggs are shed onto the pasture with the faeces, which leads to new infections. Co-infections with other gastro-intestinal nematodes such as O. ostertagi and H. contortus are common.

== Morphology ==
C. oncophora females are about 6–8 mm long, males about 5.5–9 mm. They are light red in color and have a coiled shape. Male worms have a large bursa as shown in Figure 2a. The spicules are 240-300 μm long and have a rounded end and a longitudinal line pattern. L3 stage larvae are hard to differentiate between different species, because they are very similar interspecies-wise. Eggs of C. oncophora however can be easily identified by their parallel walls.

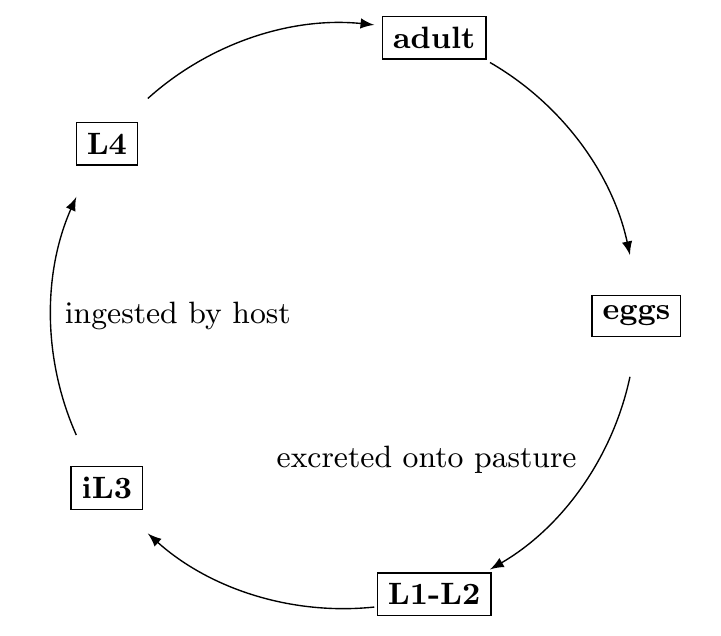
Lifecycle of D. dendriticum

== Life cycle ==
The life cycle of C. oncophora is direct. Free-living L3 stage larvae residing on the pasture are taken up by grazing cattle and pass to the small intestine. Here, they molt to L4 larvae and then to adults. Eggs are passed in the faeces to the pasture. The larvae hatch and grow to L3 stage larvae. Infective L3 stage larvae are then again taken up by grazing cattle and the life cycle repeats. The pre-patent period, which includes the time between infection and egg laying, lasts between two and three weeks. Like other trichostrongylids, early C. oncophora L4 larvae are able to arrest their development under unfavourable environmental conditions such as low temperatures and high dryness, a process termed hypobiosis. L4 larvae can stay arrested up to five months. Arrested development is characterized by a large number of individuals stopping at the same stage of development, a bimodal distribution of worm sizes, and a recent exposure of the host animal to the infectious agent prior to the prepatent period of the infectious agent. During this period of arrested development, the worms stop growing and slow down their metabolism. Arrested development allows the worms to evade many of the anthilmentics commonly used. The recommended doses are based on adult worms and normally developing larvae. Arrested development can be triggered by the following situations: seasonal influences on the larvae while outside the host, the normal host immune response interrupting the normal parasitic phase of the life cycle, or overpopulation of adults that leads to negative feedback preventing the further development of more larvae. It is advantageous for nematodes to enter arrested development as they can survive in hostile environments, cause disease in the host by a large portion of the larvae resuming development, produce large numbers of infectious eggs when the environmental conditions are once again favorable, and avoid susceptibility to various anthilmentics.

== -Omics ==
=== Genome project ===
The C. oncophora genome sequencing project has been recently approved for funding. The project was initially submitted by an international consortium of universities and research institutes and has been undertaken at the Washington University Genome Sequencing Center. The major goal is to aide with identification of novel target molecules for the development of new drugs and vaccines. The genomic data might prove as an invaluable resource for fundamental biological research, comparative genomics and provide new insights in genetic mechanisms involving drug susceptibility, resistance, host parasite relationships, host immunity, possibility to maintain the life of currently available drugs and improved molecular diagnostics.

=== Transcriptome project ===
Recent transcriptomic data of C. oncophora from different developmental stages identified protein and domain families that are important in stage-related development. The transcriptome of C. oncophora resulted in approximately 9,600,000 reads and 29,900 assembled transcripts. These transcripts represent an estimated 81% of complete transcriptome (based on estimation from the conserved low copy eukaryotic genes). Further detailed analysis of transcriptomic data and their comparison with genomic data will provide more depth insights about parasite lifecycle and what different genes are important in the free living and parasitic stages.

=== Excretome/secretome project ===
Excretome/secretome (ES) components essentially consist of proteins and other compounds that are secreted from the parasite and it constitutes the primary interface between parasite and host and may be further exploited as potential vaccine candidates. Analysis of the adult-stage C. oncophora ES, covered both the protein and glycan components. Several proteins were identified that have also been detected in the ES of other nematode species. Which include two different ASPs (activation- associated secreted proteins). These proteins have been shown extreme diversity in occurrence and function in prokaryotes and eukaryotes, which includes involvement in several processes like reproduction, cancer and immune regulation, though they await experimental characterization. Other proteins identified from ES fraction are aldose reductase and thioredoxin. These proteins are known to be involved in detoxification process. Innexin plays a role intercellular communication may be involved in modulating the response of anthelmintic; ivermectin. The above-mentioned findings are also consistent with transcriptomic data, showed the importance of these proteins because there transcripts were consistently observed in all C. oncophora life-stages, which further highlight their importance in parasite development.

== Pathology ==
Cooperia are considered less pathogenic to livestock than other common gastrointestinal nematode worms: Haemonchus or Ostertagia. However, the pathology caused by Cooperia coupled to its wide range of distribution has huge economic impact to cattle producers. Typically calves are affected most adversely. Infection causes appetite reduction and inefficient uptake of necessary nutrients which effects body weight, reproduction and can lead eventually to calf death. Although C. oncophora does not feed on host-blood, it has the capacity to burrow through the gut wall, especially in the proximal location (duodenum) which can lead to anemia in the host.

== Host defense mechanisms ==
Ruminants respond to C. oncophora infection using multiple mechanisms, and the degree of response varies based on various host-parasitic factors. Based on the response pattern, a small host proportion is classified as "high responder". These are capable of clearing the parasite rapidly, so that no eggs are detected in the feces, or there is only a very low worm burden after 42 days post infection (p.i.) with 100,000 L3 stage larvae. On the other hand, the "low responder" group is highly susceptible to infection, having a high worm burden and high egg output after 42 days p.i.. Most animals however belong to the intermediate responder group. They react initially similar to the low responder group. Although they can significantly reduce egg output after 35–42 days while worm burden in the intestine remains in range of low to high number.

C. oncophora generally tends to reside in the proximal gut, the first six meters. An effective host immune response subsequently drives the adults towards more distal locations. The fecundity of the parasite decreases in the proximal gut after immune activation, although fecundity in the distal gut remains higher. Antigens of C. oncophora larvae and adult worms are capable of triggering lymphocyte proliferation. Moreover, excretory/secretory products (ES) can pronounce the immune response. Pattern and degree of response varies in primary and secondary exposure. The immune response here is mainly of Th2 type. Primary infection does not involve recruitment of specific lymphocytes to the intestinal mucosa. There are no major changes in the T-lymphocytes subsets of the mesenterial lymph node. Instead γδ-T cells guide the immune proliferation initially after primary exposure. On the other hand, increased B-cell proliferation leads increase in antibodies in serum and mucus secretion.

An experimental infection of calves with 100,000L3 larvae caused gradual increase in adult worm specific IgA and IgG1 continued with increase in IgG1/IgG2 ratio. However, in the mucus, proportion of IgA was higher than IgG1. IgA/antigen complex can bind to the Fc receptor of the eosinophil and thereby induce the release of anti-inflammatory mediators and cytokines which can in turn reduce the worm load. Moreover, it has been demonstrated that secretory IgA (sIgA) in the mucous membrane can activate eosinophils more efficiently than serum IgA.

On the other hand, response to secondary exposure involves increase in CD4+ T-cell in the lymph node, in the peripheral blood and in Payer's patches of the proximal gut. However, CD4+ T-cell numbers decrease in the lamina propria after 28 days of secondary experimental infection. Activated cells from the lamina propria migrate to the lymph node and peripheral blood. Acute inflammation in the primed proximal gut occur earlier and eosinophil level normalizes before 14 days of infection. On the contrary, there is an accumulation of eosinophils in the distal gut at around 14 days while proportion of eosinophil increase again in proximal gut after 28 days. This indicates two waves of eosinophil influx where CD4+ T-cell induces second influx rather first one.

Generally, mast cells are also involved with eosinophils in the protection against nematodes. In case of primary and secondary infections with C. oncophora, no direct involvement mast cells have been proved yet.

During secondary infections, even low dose exposure can stimulate immune response at the level of typical high dose exposure. Serum IgE levels are also increased during secondary infections, confirming serological protection. All these events are mast cell independent.

There is a general decrease in the expression of apoproteins after C. oncophora infection. However, the resistant host still maintains higher level of apoproteins compared to low responder. There is a disruption of lipid metabolism. It is known that dietary rearrangement of lipid metabolism can give protection against nematode infections. Dietary poly unsaturated fatty acids (PUFA) omega-3 and omega-6 can boost up the protection. Therefore, treatment with omega-3 PUFA has been associated low egg count in the feces. As known from other gut inflammations, over expression of lysozymes (LYZ1, LYZ2, LYZ3) can be observed in the gut after C. oncophora infection. These happens to sustain the inflammatory cascades against parasite antigens. Some other genes encoding cell adhesion molecules including CDH26, collectins and gelectins are up-regulated in infected ruminants. CDH26, eosinophil number recruitment and amount of adult parasites correlates strongly in the mucosa. CDH26 level is positively correlated with Cooperia specific IgA.

== Prevention and control ==
Prevention is a difficult task. Cooperia larvae can withstand in adverse environmental conditions and can survive in grass lands even up to a year. Larvae can undergo dormant during winter and can comeback upon suitable conditions. Combined efforts that are taken to prevent typical worm infection are also applicable for Cooperia. These include maintaining a healthy herd, pasture management, careful grazing, plowing the field, avoiding congested and humid environments, keeping calves separately and ensuring hygiene. On the other hand, selective breeding can give rise to "high respondent" or resistant to infection progenies.

Broad spectrum anthelmintics are also effective against adult worms and larvae. There are several benzimidazoles were successful in clearing infection, including albendazole, febantel, fenbendazole, oxfendazole. Moreover, levamisole and several macrocyclic lactones (e.g. abamectin, doramectin, eprinomectin, ivermectin, moxidectin) are reported to be effective. After multiple rounds of exposure adult ruminants can overcome the adverse effects of the parasite however still it act as reservoir for new infection.

=== Resistance to anthelmintics ===
Anthelmintic drug resistance is a widespread emerging problem. Resistance has been reported to all broad spectrum anthelmintics, which are benzimidazoles (BZs), levamisole/morantel (LEV) and macrocyclic lactones (ML). There are numbers of reports about resistance of C. oncophora to MLs. MLs include ivermectin (IVM), which has been extensively used to treat livestock gastrointestinal parasites since the 1980s. MLs bind irreversible to Glutmate gated chloride ion (GluCl) channels, leading to hyperpolarisation. Pharyngeal and somatic muscle cells get paralyzed, which results in starvation of the worms and also their removal from the gastrointestinal tract. Broad spectrum anthelmintics include benzimidazoles (BZs). BZs have been used since the 1960s, and resistance was detected in sheep shortly after commercialization of the first drug, called thiabendazole, in 1964. Reason for emerging resistance is selection for resistant individuals, particularly by high treatment frequency and under-dosing of the drugs. Other nematodes such as H. contortus are more susceptible to the drugs, which leads to a shift in the nematode biome towards higher relative amount of C. oncophora.

Molecular mechanisms underlying the resistance against anthelmintics are being investigated. In general, drug resistance can develop in four different ways: 1) the drug does not bind to the target due to target changes, 2) changes in the xenobiotic metabolism that remove the drug or prevent activation, 3) changes in drug distribution in the organism, or 4) amplification of genes that overcome drug action. There are currently many investigations concerning amplification of genes that play a role in overcoming drug action. This includes transporters which are part of the xenobiotic metabolism by absorbing, distributing and eliminating external substances and their metabolites. One example is ATP-binding cassette (ABC) transporter families. P-glycoproteins (PGPs) are part of this family and substrates of MLs. Their up-regulation was found to be associated with ivermectin and moxidectin resistance in H. contortus. In C. oncophora, a P-glycoprotein called pgp-11 was found to be up-regulated in resistant adult worms compared to susceptible worms, but so far it has not been proven that up-regulation of pgp-11 actually protects the worm from MLs.

== Epidemiology ==
The epidemiology of this species can vary by geographic distribution. For example, the northern hemisphere sees arrested development of the L4 stage more often during the winter. The subtropical areas see arrested development more often during the dry seasons. There is not a lot of relevant epidemiology information available. It is known that C. oncophora has been found in temperate climates such as the United States and Brazil. Studies have been done to establish the prevalence in these areas. The lack of information may be due to less frequent reporting of cattle nematodes as compared to the frequency of human nematodes, and that Cooperia oncophora is not commonly reported as the sole cause of infection. C. oncophora often causes secondary infection alongside the infection caused by Ostertagia ostertagi and Haemonchus contortus. O. ostertagi and H. contortus cause more severe signs of infection than C. oncophora. Because of this difference in signs, O. ostertagi and H. contortus are often reported as the cause of disease rather than C. oncophora.
