= Longistrongylus =

Scientific classification
- Domain: Eukaryota
- Kingdom: Animalia
- Phylum: Nematoda
- Class: Chromadorea
- Order: Rhabditida
- Family: Trichostrongylidae
- Genus: Longistrongylus; Le Roux, 1931

Genus of roundworms

Longistrongylus is a genus of nematodes belonging to the family Trichostrongylidae.

Species:

- Longistrongylus muraschkinzevi (Shulz & Kadenatsii, 1950)
