= FAMACHA =

Treatment for barber's pole worm

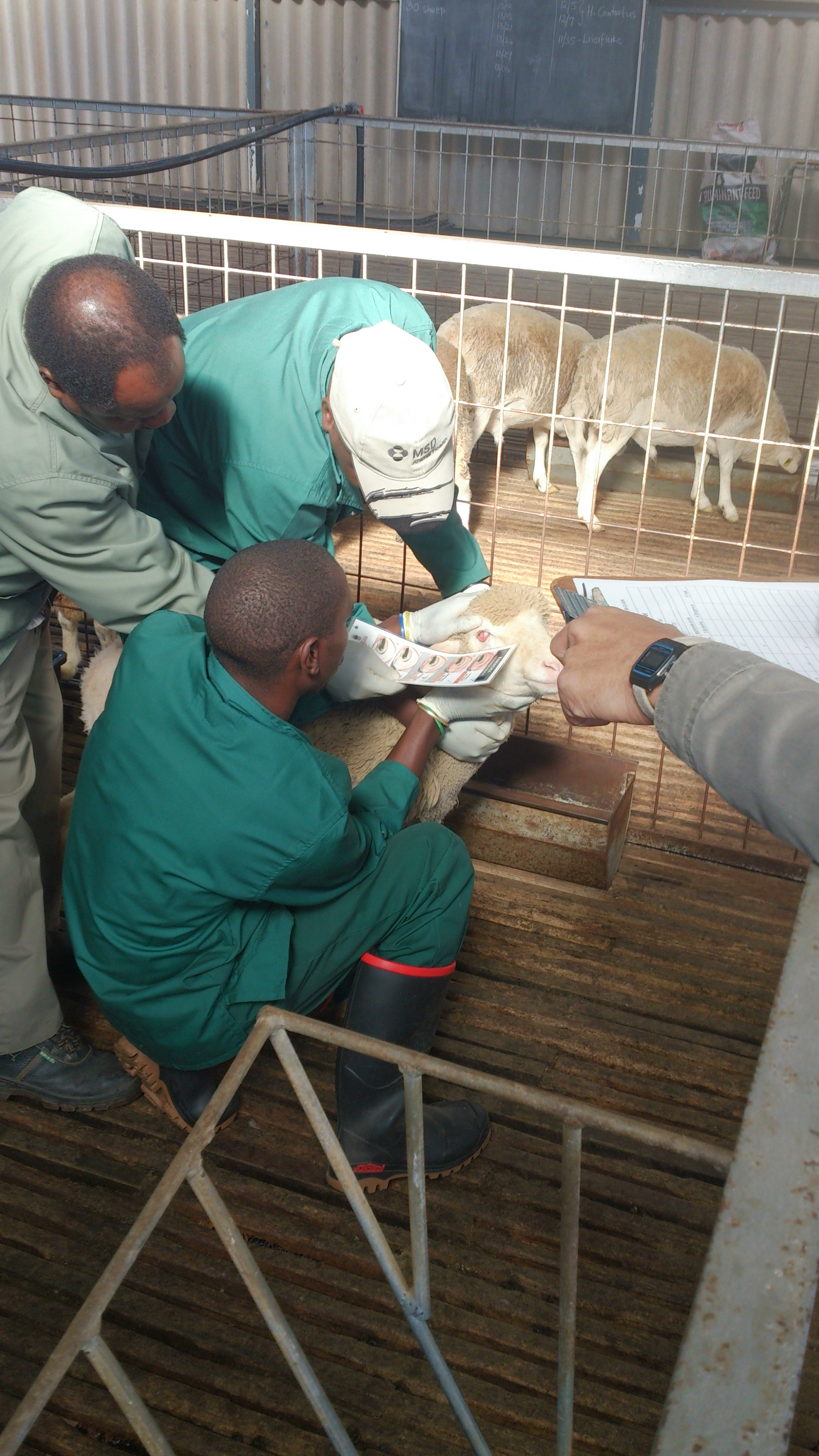
FAMACHA being implemented

FAMACHA (FAffa MAlan CHArt) is a selective treatment method for controlling the level of parasitic barber's pole worm (Haemonchus contortus, also known as twisted wireworm) among domesticated small ruminant populations. In contrast with earlier, more aggressive approaches, under FAMACHA only certain sheep or goats in a flock are selected for treatment. Selection for treatment is based on the degree of anemia the animals are displaying in their mucous membranes, which is assessed through a colour guided chart.

== Background ==
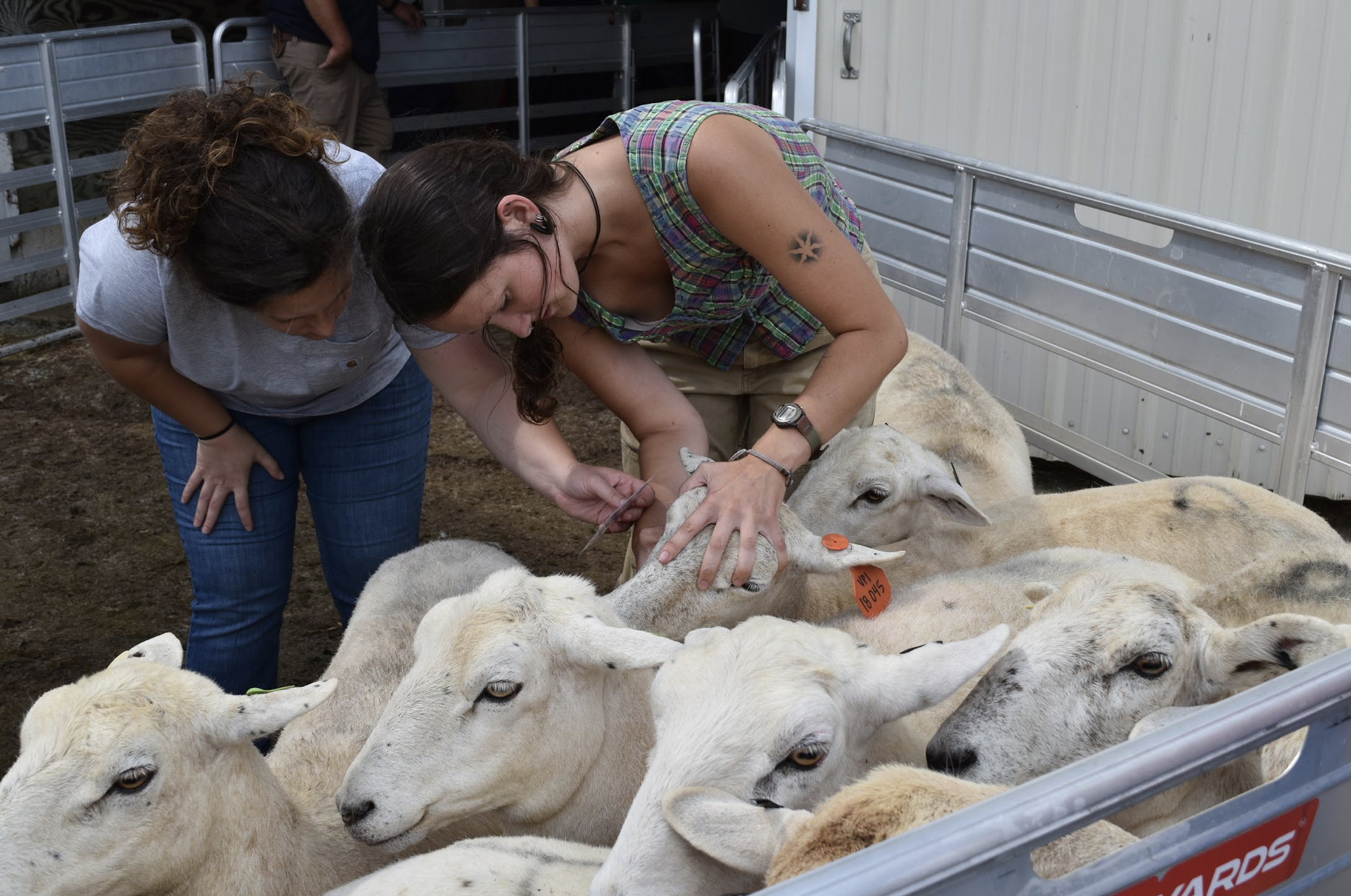
Women checking sheep herd's FAMACHA

In the late 20th century, it became routine for shepherds in intensive agriculture to treat all the sheep in their flocks with dewormer (anthelmintic) to prevent haemonchosis. However, this approach carried major downsides. The most obvious was the expense, but the more insidious threat was that overly aggressive application of dewormer would select for worms resistant to the dewormer being used. Additionally, shepherds would not always apply treatments equally or in the suggested dosage, and would sometimes apply a medly of different dewormers, which both make the selection process even faster and anthelmintic resistance more common.

The FAMACHA method of selective treatment was developed by three South African researchers: Francois Malan, Gareth Bath and Jan van Wyk. They published an article describing it in detail 2002, albeit after local testing in South Africa earlier. The method has since been implemented successfully in various locations around the world.

The aim of the method is to maintain a sufficient susceptible H. contortus worm population ('refugia') on the pasture. By only dosing those sheep in critical need of treatment, selection for worms resistant against treatment is slowed, while at the same time the farmer can monitor and cull those sheep with a poor natural resistance against these worms. The method has also been applied to goats in regions with heavy worm populations.

== Procedure ==
The FAMACHA procedure involves using the mucous membrane of the eye to assess a ruminant for their level of anemia (blood loss). Anemia is usually a sign of a heavy worm load.

The shepherd covers the top eyelid, gently pushes down on the eyelid, and pulls down the bottom eyelid; the mucous membranes pop into view. The shepherd then directly compares them with a provided eye colour chart. The matching colours estimates the level of anemia in small ruminants. A sheep with a score of 1 has a pink-red mucous membrane colour and does not require any treatment at all; whereas a sheep with a score of 5 has pale white mucous membranes and likely requires immediate dosing and direct medical treatment. Different gradations between these have guidance on the chart, and can be recorded if desired to monitor a specific ram or ewe.
