= Graphidium =

Scientific classification
- Kingdom: Animalia
- Phylum: Nematoda
- Class: Chromadorea
- Order: Rhabditida
- Family: Trichostrongylidae
- Genus: Graphidium; Railliet & Henry, 1909
- Species: G. strigosum

Binomial name
- Graphidium strigosum (Dujardin, 1845)

Genus of roundworms

Graphidium is a monotypic genus of nematodes belonging to the family Trichostrongylidae. The only species is Graphidium strigosum.

The species is found in Europe, Southern America.
