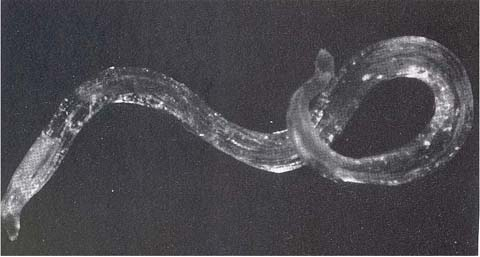

Scientific classification
- Kingdom: Animalia
- Phylum: Nematoda
- Class: Chromadorea
- Order: Rhabditida
- Family: Strongylidae
- Genus: Oesophagostomum; Molin, 1861

Species
- Oesophagostomum aculeatum Oesophagostomum bifurcum Oesophagostomum brumpti Oesophagostomum stephanostomum Oesophagostomum stephanostomum var thomasi

= Oesophagostomum =

Genus of roundworms

Oesophagostomum is a genus of parasitic nematodes (roundworms) of the family Strongylidae. These worms occur in Africa, Brazil, China, Indonesia and the Philippines. The majority of human infection with Oesophagostomum is localized to northern Togo and Ghana. Because the eggs may be indistinguishable from those of the hookworms (which are widely distributed and can also rarely cause helminthomas), the species causing human helminthomas are rarely identified with accuracy. Oesophagostomum, especially O. bifurcum, are common parasites of livestock and animals like goats, pigs and non-human primates, although it seems that humans are increasingly becoming favorable hosts as well. The disease they cause, oesophagostomiasis, is known for the nodule formation it causes in the intestines of its infected hosts, which can lead to more serious problems such as dysentery. Although the routes of human infection have yet to be elucidated sufficiently, it is believed that transmission occurs through oral-fecal means, with infected humans unknowingly ingesting soil containing the infectious filariform larvae.

Oesophagostomum infection is largely localized to northern Togo and Ghana in western Africa where it is a serious public health problem. Because it is so localized, research on intervention measures and the implementation of effective public health interventions have been lacking. In recent years, however, there have been advances in the diagnosis of Oesophagostomum infection with PCR assays and ultrasound and recent interventions involving mass treatment with albendazole shows promise for controlling and possibly eliminating Oesophagostomum infection in northern Togo and Ghana.

== Taxonomy and classification ==
Oesophagostomum is part of the phylum Nematoda. This phylum is composed of five orders: Ascaridida, Enoplida, Oxyurida, Spirurida, Strongylida and Rhabditida. Strongylida has three superfamilies - Ancyclostomatoidea, Trichostrongyloidea and Strongylidea. Oesophagostomum lie within the Strongyloidae.

== Synonyms ==
The prominent, single-nodule form of oesophagostomiasis is often referred to as Dapaong tumor named after a city in northern Togo. Within the villages of Togo, villagers often refer to it as ‘Kounkoul’, which means ‘turtle’ in the native Moba-language; the name aptly describes the hard, round mass in the patient's abdomen.

== History of discovery ==
The first case of infection by Oesophagostomum spp. was reported in 1905 by Railliet and Henry, describing parasites found in the tumors of the caecum and colon of a male hailing from the Omo River in Southern Ethiopia. In 1910, H. Wolferstan Thomas reported the second known case, describing the macroscopical and microscopical pathology of Oesophagostomum stephanostomum. His descriptions were based on his observations regarding the post mortem of an infected Brazilian man who died from extreme dysentery. In subsequent decades, several more cases of Oesophagostomum spp. infection in humans were found in Brazil, Indonesia, Canada, and several areas of Africa, particularly Northern Ghana, Nigeria and Brazil. Of all reported Oesophagostomum human infections, only O. aculeatum, O. bifurcum and O. stephanostomum have been identified with certainty.

== Clinical presentation in humans ==
There is no overarching clinical picture for symptoms of oesophagostomiasis; however, most patients experience pain in the lower right quadrant, accompanied by the presence of one or several protruding abdominal masses. In oesophagostomiasis, larvae can invade the colon wall, potentially causing two pervading types of nodular pathology. Multinodular disease is characterized by the formation of many tiny nodular lesions containing worms and pus along the colon wall. About 15% of patients have this form of oesophagostomiasis. Nodules themselves are usually not a problem, but they can give rise to further complications, such as bowel obstruction, peritonitis and intestinal volvulus. In rare cases, serious disease can occur including emaciation, fluid in the pericardium, cardiomegaly, hepatosplenomegaly, perisplenitis and enlargement of the appendix.

Single-nodular disease, more commonly known as Dapaong disease, is characterized by the development of a single mass that develops throughout the colon wall. This is the most common form of oesophagostomiasis, affecting 85% of patients. This nodule can instigate intense tissue reactions that result in the formation of painful projecting masses.

Common misdiagnoses include carcinoma, appendicitis, amebiasis and tuberculosis.

The following is a summary of the second recorded case of oesophagostomiasis, as reported by H. Wolferstan Thomas in 1910:

Patient: male, 36 years old, native of the Rio Purus region in the Amazon State Chief complaints: suffering from acute dysentery, later experiencing deliriousness Outcome: Died within the three days following his admission. Major Findings: Lungs were emphysematous. Heart had evidence of hypertrophy in muscle, with some atheromatous patches along the aortic ring. Exterior of the small intestine was lined with several prominent tumors dark in color, 37 in total. Most of the tumors were found between the outside muscular layer and the bowel's peritoneal covering of the bowel. The tumors were generally small and varied in shape, from smooth ovular masses to flat button shapes to elongated masses akin to a leech; they were elevated by as much as 6 to 8 mm above the bowl surface. These nodules were found to contain one worm each, no more, no less. In the interior of the small intestine, twenty nodules were found along the walls, causing a discernible bulging of the mucous membrane. The caecum walls were irregularly thickened and dark in color, with three ovular tumors containing immature adult Oesophagostomum. Interior of the caecum was filled with rope-like opaque masses of rows of cystic tumors, which caused great thickening of the walls. Examination of the exterior of the ascending colon revealed the formation of thick adhesions spanning the whole length of the colon; these adhesions were filled with fat, enlarged glands and omental tissue. Underneath were a multitude of small cystic tumors that ruptured upon disturbance of the adhesion, disclosing small worms. The interior of the colon was most affected, with tumors of widely varying shapes and sizes occupying the walls and floor of the gut, causing as much as 5 mm of thickening of colon walls.

== Transmission ==
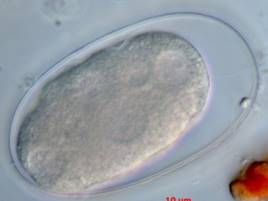
Egg of Oesophagostomum sp. from primates in Côte d'Ivoire

Transmission of Oesophagostomum is believed to be oral-fecal for both humans and animals, largely because percutaneous infection with Oesophagostomum has never been reported. It is unclear whether or not parasite transmission is specifically waterborne, foodborne, or both. Regardless, introduction of the stage three infective larvae is necessary for human infection. Much about the biological mechanism of transmission is still unknown, and current knowledge of oral-fecal transmission mechanisms does not explain why Oesophagostomum are mostly localized to Northern Togo and Ghana. It is possible that there are behavioral factors or unique soil conditions that facilitate larval development and are not found outside the current endemic areas. Oesophagostomiasis is generally classified as a zoonotic disease, which is an infectious disease that can be transmitted between animals and humans. This has been called into question recently, as recent research has found that human-to-human transmission is possible.

== Reservoir ==
Oesophagostomum are carried predominantly by non-humans, infecting cattle, sheep, goats, wild pigs, and primates. Humans are largely presumed to be an accidental host, as they are not suitable for completion of the Oesophagostomum development; however, the extreme localization of oesophagostomiasis to northern Togo and Ghana in Africa suggests the possibility that the Oesophagostomum is increasingly exhibiting preference for human hosts.

Until recently it was believed that primates were the main reservoirs of human-infecting Oesophagostomum in northern Togo and Ghana, as these particular species have a considerable concentration in non-human primate reservoirs. A 2005 study done by van Lieshout and de Gruijter found that O. bifurcum in humans from northern Ghana is distinct from the O. bifurcum found in olive baboons and mona monkeys outside the endemic area. They used species-specific PCR and microscopy to establish the identification of two separate species of O. bifurcum. These results are significant, as they necessitate further research to determine the definitive reservoirs of human-infecting O. bifurcum.

== Vector ==
Oesophagostomiasis has no vector.

== Incubation period ==
The life-cycle of Oesophagostomum can usually be completed in less than 60 days. When the eggs are passed into the feces to the outside environment, they hatch into stage one larve. The stage two larve then molt twice, developing into infective stage three larva in 6–7 days. These stage three larvae can survive extended periods of desiccation by shrinking within their sheaths.

== Morphology ==
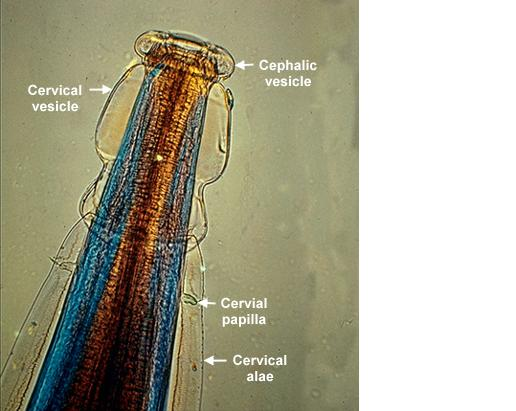
Morphology

Adult worms of all Oesophagostomum spp. exhibit a cephalic groove by its proximal gut as well as a visible secretory pore, or stomum, at the same level of the oesophagus19. Like other nematodes, Oesophagostomum spp. contain a developed, multi-nucleate digestive tract as well as a reproductive system. Their developed buccal capsule and club-shaped oesophagus are useful for distinguishing Oesophagostomum spp. from hookworms.

Both sexes of adults have a cephalic inflation and an oral opening lined with both internal and external leaf crowns. Female adults, which have a length range of 6.5–24 mm, are generally larger than their male counterparts, with a length range of 6–16.6 mm. Males can be distinguished by their bell-like copulatory bursa, located in the tail, and their paired rodlike spicules.

Eggs are ovular in shape and range from 50 to 100 micrometres in size; they closely resemble those of hookworms, which renders diagnosis via stool analysis useless in areas co-infected with both Oesophagostomum and hookworm.

== Life cycle ==
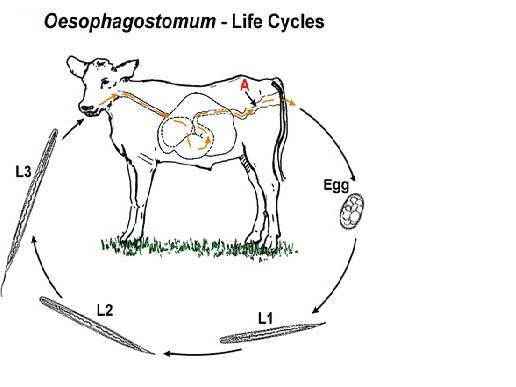
Life cycle

For non-human hosts, the life cycle of Oesophagostomum begins with the passing of eggs in the animal feces. From there the eggs develop into stage one larvae. These larvae then spend 6–7 days in the environment developing into stage two and then infectious stage three larvae. Infection begins with the ingestion of soil contaminated with stage three larvae. After ingestion the larvae end up in the large intestine, unsheathing and penetrating the intestinal wall to form nodules. The resulting adult worms that remain in the intestinal lumen copulate; the eggs from the female are then deposited in the feces. Females usually lay around 5,000 eggs per day, which is on par with reproductive rates of other nematodes within Strongyloidea.

For human hosts, the life cycle is very similar to that of Oesophagostomum in animals. It begins when an animal reservoir defecates into the soil, leaving feces infested with eggs that develop into rhabitiform larvae. These larve then develop into stage two and then infectious stage three larvae in the environment over the course of 6–7 days. Human infection occurs when soil or water containing the third-stage larvae is ingested, presumably via contaminated meat obtained from infected livestock or crops with contaminated soil. Once ingested, the filariform larvae migrate to the submucosa of the small or large intestine, then to the lumen of the colon. The developing worms then penetrate the intestinal tissues, causing nodular lesion formation in the intestines and colon; it is in these nodules that the larvae mature to stage four larvae. These larvae may then emerge from their nodules and migrate back to the intestinal lumen, where they mature into adults. But many larvae often do not complete development and remain in their colon nodules, as humans are generally unsuitable hosts for Oesophagostomum. The instances where Oesophagostomum have completed development in humans seem to be dependent on certain environmental and host factors that have yet to be identified.

== Diagnostic tests ==
A definitive diagnosis of Oesophagostomum infection is traditionally done by demonstrating the presence of the larval or young adult forms in nodules of the intestinal wall via surgical examination of tissue. The larvae usually found in tissues can be 500 nanometers or longer. With microscopy, one can identify the larvae based on the presence of somatic musculature divided into four quarters, along with a multinucleated intestine as well as an immature reproductive system.

Laboratory methods are of little use for Oesophagostomum diagnosis. It is virtually impossible to make a diagnosis based on microscopy of stool samples alone, as Oesophagostomum eggs cannot be differentiated from hookworm eggs, which are often found in Oesophagostomum endemic areas. The only way to differentiate between the two species of eggs is to perform coproculture, which allows eggs to develop to their stage three larvae, although this is both time-consuming and unreliable. Immunoassay tests like ELISA that monitoring for increases in IgG4 antibodies can indicate tissue invasion by Oesophagostomum.

Recent advances, however, have allowed for less invasive and more accurate methods of diagnosis. The following is a review of three articles detailing the diagnostic use of PCR assays and sonographic imaging. Verweij, Jaco J., Anton M. Polderman, et al. “PCR assay for the specific amplification of Oesophagostomum bifurcum DNA from human faeces.” International Journal for Parasitology 30.2 (2000): 137-142. This study developed a molecular-based approach to diagnosing oesophagostomiasis caused by O. bifurcum in humans. Using genetic markers in ribosomal DNA, the researchers developed PCR assays to selectively amplify O. bifurcum DNA from human fecal samples. These assays achieved sensitivity ratings of 94.6% and specificity of 100%, suggesting that the PCR method could be a viable alternative to the long-standing methods of diagnosis as well as an opportunity to reveal more about the epidemiology of oesophagostomiasis.

Storey, P A; Anemana, S; et al. (2000). "Ultrasound diagnosis of oesophagostomiasis". Br. J. Radiol. 73 (867): 328–32.

Sonographic imaging and ultrasound were used to examine two cases of oesophagostomiasis in the Nalerigu hospital in northern Ghana. The technology allowed for the detection of intestinal and abdominal wall modules, as well as their size, type and location in the case of the ultrasound. Multinodular disease was representedby nodular colonic lesions and pseudokidney appearances, while the single-nodular Dapaong tumor had the appearance of an echo-free lumen surrounded by a defined but badly reflective wall. The ability to diagnose oesophagostomiasis via ultrasound can reduce the number of excessive invasive surgeries and put greater emphasis on chemotherapy.

Verweij, Jaco J, Eric A T Brienen, et al. “Simultaneous detection and quantification of Ancylostoma duodenale, Necator americanus and Oesophagostomum bifurcum in fecal samples using multiplex real-time PCR. (2007) Am. J. of Trop. Med. Hygiene 77 (4) 685-690

A multiplex PCR method was developed for simultaneously detection of A. dudodenale, N. americanus and O. bifurcum in human fecal samples. The method was tested on human fecal samples from an area in Ghana where co-infections with all three species are endemic. Results showed that the method was both highly specific and sensitive, attaining 100% specificity and sensitivities of 100%, 86.7%, and 100% for detection of N. americanus, O. bifurcum and A. duodenale respectively. Furthermore, cycle threshold values, which correspond to parasite-specific DNA load, correlated with measured intensity of infection as demonstrated in Kato-Kato smears. This PCR method could potentially elucidate species-specific transmission pathways of hookworm-like infections and improve monitoring of interventions.

== Management and therapy ==
The typical adult therapy for oesophagostomiasis is a single 400 mg dose of albendazole (200 mg for children) or pyrantel pamoate. Albendazole works by binding to the free beta tubulin, which inhibits tubulin polymerization. This results in the inhibition of glucose uptake by the Oesophagostomum. Albendazole and pyrantel pamoate at these doses have cure rates of 85% and 59-82%, respectively. Excision of Oesophagostomum larvae from nodules has been shown to have a curative effect on the patient but is invasive and more resource intensive than chemotherapy.

For oesophagostomiasis with complications, the type of treatment varies depending on the severity of the disease. Usually 200–400 mg of albendazole will be given immediately and continued for up to 5 days in conjunction with 250 mg dosages of amoxicillin. In the case of formation of abscesses or fistulae arising from Dapaong tumors, incision and drainage is performed, followed by a regimen of albendazole and antibiotic treatment.

== Epidemiology ==
Oesophagostomiasis is endemic or potentially endemic to 35 countries; approximately 250,000 are infected worldwide, with 1 million more at risk according to the Gideon Infectious Diseases Database. Most of the cases originate in Africa, specifically in Ghana, Togo, Uganda, Nigeria, Zimbabwe and other nearby countries. A few sporadic cases have been reported in countries in South America and Southeast Asia, including Brazil, Indonesia and Malaysia. The vast majority of clinical cases have been collected from northern Togo and Ghana, in West Africa. 156 cases from the areas alone were collected in a 2000 study; before then, only 116 cases were recorded in the literature. O. bifurcum infection in northern Togo and Ghana is found in virtually every village, with some rural areas exhibiting as much as 90% prevalence.

Prevalence is higher in children between ages 2–10), and females older than 5 years of ages have higher prevalence than males within the same age group. These age demographic and gender discrepancies are not yet sufficiently explained – possible factors include differential exposure to contaminated water and strength of immune response.

A study done by Krepel in 1992 revealed a correlation between infection with O. bifurcum and N. americanus in that individuals living in endemic villages were either coinfected with both parasites or neither. This could be due to cofactors shared by both parasites, including poor hygiene, certain agricultural practices and the dearth of potable water suitable for consumption.

Below is a review of some epidemiological studies on the epidemiology of Oesophagostomum bifurcum in northern Togo and Ghana.

"Human Oesophagostomum infection in northern Togo and Ghana: epidemiological aspects." By: Krepel et al. Annals of Tropical Medicine and Parasitology.1992. 86:289-300.

A regional survey of O. bifurcum infection was carried out in Togo and Ghana. The parasite was found in 38 of the 43 villages surveyed, with the highest prevalence rates reaching 59% in some small, isolated villages. Infection was found to be positively correlated with hookworm infection; however, the difficulty in distinguishing these parasites may have had some confounding effect. Infection rates were low in children under 3 years of age, beyond that, rates of infection increased dramatically until 10 years of age. Females showed higher prevalence of infection (34%) than men (24%). Based on these epidemiological studies, this group was able to conclude that tribe, profession, or religion had no effect on the prevalence of infection in the different communities surveyed. The habitats and life cycle of this parasite do not explain its distribution.

"Clinical epidemiology and classification of human oesophagostomiasis." By: P.A. Storey et al. Trans R Soc Trop Med Hyg. 2000. 94:177-182.

The study investigated the clinical epidemiology of oesophagostomiasis by observing 156 cases in the Nalerigu hospital between 1996 and 1998. About 1 patient/week presented with this disease over the course of two years and 1% of all surgeries carried out were related to oesophagostomiasis. 13% of the patients presented with the multinodular form of the disease in which they had several nodules in their small intestine, abdominal pain, diarrhea, and weight loss. The other 87% of the patients presented with the Dapaong, or single, tumor form of the disease that was associated with inflammation in the abdomen, fever, and pain.

== Public health and prevention strategies/vaccines ==
Given that infective Oesophagostomum larvae are most likely transmitted via oral-fecal routes, sufficiently cleaning and cooking meat and vegetables, as well as boiling all consumed water or only using potable water would help to complement a mass treatment program. Factors like religion, family size and wealth do not suffice in explaining the unique epidemiology of Oesophagostomum; geographic and geological factors must be explored in more detail.

Since oesophagostomiasis is primarily a regional problem (localized in northern Ghana and Togo, an optimal approach to addressing it requires mobilization of resources within and around the endemic area. One proposed solution is to organize all research and intervention projects at the local level, so as to instill knowledge of the infection in the community, and establish a regional collaboration between Ghana, Togo, and Burkina Faso in order to effectively combat oesophagostomiasis.

There is no vaccine for oesophagostomiasis, although prolonged treatment with albendazole seems to be highly effective in countering the Oesophagostomum threat. In fact, recent research indicates that albendazole treatment may be the best intervention available for eliminating oesophagostomiasis from northern Togo and Ghana; following treatment, prevalence continued to go down even with interruption of the intervention. The following is a review of J. B. Ziem's study of a mass treatment campaign in northern Ghana, as well as the follow-up conducted with the Lymphatic Filariasis Elimination Program.

Ziem, Juventus B et al. “Impact of repeated mass treatment on human Oesophagostomum and hookworm infections in northern Ghana.” Tropical Medicine & International Health: TM & IH 11.11 (2006): 1764–72.

This was a two-year study, with four rounds of albendazole treatment administered to a village in Ghana; the target area and an untreated control area were monitored. In the target area, prevalence went down dramatically from 53.0% to 5.4% in the first year to 0.8% in the second year. Larval counts in stools also went down, as well as hookworm prevalence. In contrast, the control area saw an increase in prevalence from 18.5% to 37%. The results indicate potential for elimination of oesophagostomiasis utilizing similar albendazole-distributing mass treatment programs.

Ziem, J. B. et al. “Annual mass treatment with albendazole might eliminate human oesophagostomiasis from the endemic focus in northern Ghana.” Tropical Medicine & International Health: TM & IH 11.11 (2006): 1759–63.

This follow-up to the original two-year study by J.B. Ziem saw collaboration with the Lymphatic Filariasis Elimination Programme, essentially expanding the scope of the Oesophagostomum Intervention Research Program that Ziem worked under. 11 villages across northeastern Ghana were given albendazole-ivermectin treatment and monitored for changes in prevalence; once again, decreases in both Oesophagostomum and hookworm infections occurred after two years of mass treatment. However, after interrupting mass treatment, Oesophagostomum prevalence continued to decrease even as hookworm prevalence increased again. Human oesophagostomiasis infection thus seems interruptible; even small numbers of persistent Oesophagostomum post-treatment were not sufficient to cause reinfection.

== Online resources ==
- - a free online compendium of all aspects of Oesophagostomum bifurcum biology
- - J.B. Ziem's doctoral thesis on controlling human oesophagostomiasis in northern Togo and Ghana
- - A.M. Polderman's review on human oesophagostomiasis
