= Teladorsagia =

Scientific classification
- Domain: Eukaryota
- Kingdom: Animalia
- Phylum: Nematoda
- Class: Chromadorea
- Order: Rhabditida
- Family: Trichostrongylidae
- Subfamily: Trichostrongylinae
- Genus: Teladorsagia; Andreeva & Satubaldin, 1954

Genus of worms

Teladorsagia is a genus of nematodes belonging to the family Trichostrongylidae.

The genus has cosmopolitan distribution.

Species:

- Teladorsagia circumcincta (Stadelman, 1894)
- Teladorsagia davtiani Andreeva & Satubaldin, 1954
- Teladorsagia trifurcata (Ransom, 1907)
