= Bunostomum =

Scientific classification
- Kingdom: Animalia
- Phylum: Nematoda
- Class: Chromadorea
- Order: Rhabditida
- Family: Ancylostomatidae
- Genus: Bunostomum; Railliet, 1902

Genus of roundworms

Bunostomum is a genus of nematodes of the small intestine of ruminants and camelids. Important species include B. phlebotomum in calves and B. trigonocephalum in lambs. The worms are stout and measure 1–3 centimetres (0.4–1.2 in) in length. Young animals are most commonly affected and only several hundred worms are necessary to cause morbidity. Adults often carry worms without showing clinical signs.

== Phylogeny ==
Cladogram according to Catalogue of Life and Dyntaxa:

- Ancylostomatidae
  - Bunostomum
    - Bunostomum phlebotomum
    - Bunostomum trigonocephalum
  - Ancylostoma
  - Globocephaloides
  - Globocephalus
  - Uncinaria

== Life cycle ==
The life cycle is direct, with a prepatent period of 30–56 days. Eggs hatch on the ground and develop into infective larvae in several weeks. Larvae penetrate through the skin or are ingested and then migrate to the respiratory system, are coughed up and swallowed, and finally reach the small intestine. Eggs are then shed in the feces of the infected host.

== Clinical signs and diagnosis ==
Diarrhoea is the primary sign, along with systemic signs of anorexia, lethargy, and weight loss if the worm burden is severe. Hypoproteinaemia, anaemia, and dehydration often occur. Skin involvement due to larvae penetration appears as lesions, especially on the feet and limbs. Eggs can be found by analysis of faecal samples, or adults can be seen in the small intestine at necropsy.

== Treatment and control ==
All available anthelmintics are efficient at treating the infection. Prophylactic anthelmintic treatment may help prevent the disease, as well as pasture management to avoid egg and larval accumulation.
