= Brayton H. Ransom =

Brayton Howard Ransom
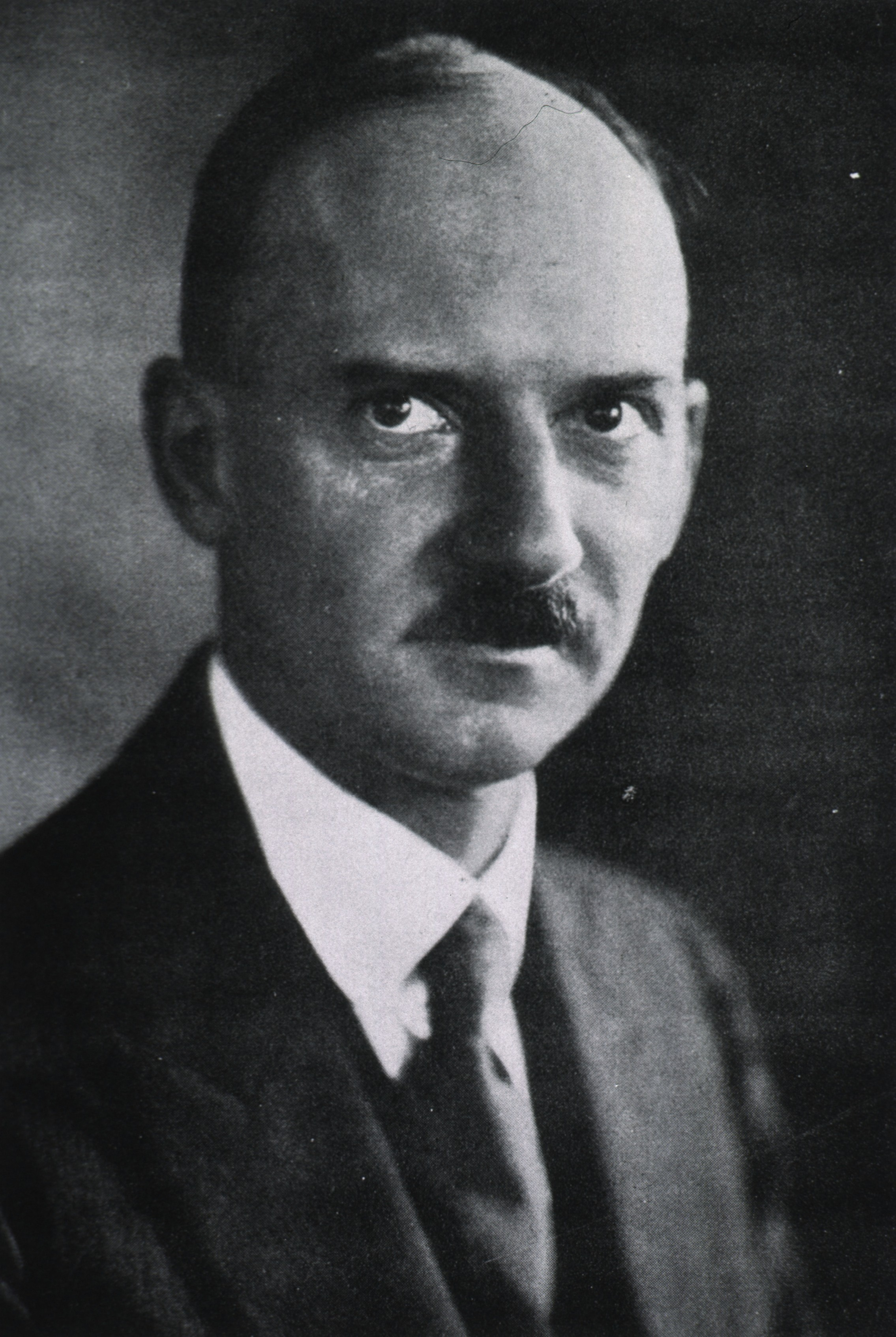
- Born: March 24, 1879; Missouri Valley, Iowa
- Died: September 17, 1925 (aged 46); Washington, D.C.
- Scientific career
- Fields: Zoology, Parasitology
- Institutions: USDA Bureau of Animal Industry

Brayton Howard Ransom (March 24, 1879 – September 17, 1925) was an American zoologist and veterinary parasitologist who served as Chief of the Zoological Division, Bureau of Animal Industry, United States Department of Agriculture from 1906 until his death at age 46. He was a founding member of both the American Society of Parasitologists and the Helminthological Society of Washington, a fellow of the American Association for the Advancement of Science, and served on the editorial boards of the Journal of Parasitology and the American Journal of Tropical Medicine.
