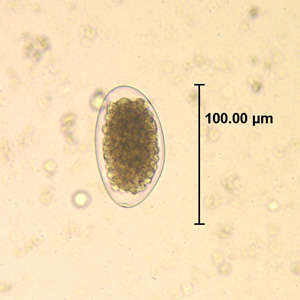

Scientific classification
- Kingdom: Animalia
- Phylum: Nematoda
- Class: Chromadorea
- Order: Rhabditida
- Superfamily: Trichostrongyloidea
- Family: Trichostrongylidae; Leiper, 1912

Type genus
- Trichostrongylus Looss, 1905

= Trichostrongylidae =

Family of roundworms

Trichostrongylidae is a family of nematode in the suborder Strongylida.

== Genera ==
Genera:

- Africanastrongylus Hoberg, Abrams & Ezenwa, 2008
- Amidostomoides Petrova, 1987
- Arnfieldia Sarwar, 1957
- Ashworthius Le Roux, 1930
- Batrachostrongylus Yuen, 1963
- Biogastranema Rohrbacher & Ehrenford, 1954
- Camelostrongylus Orloff, 1933
- Chabaudstrongylus Durette-Desset & Denke, 1978
- Cnizostrongylus Chabaud, Durette-Desset & Houin, 1967
- Cooperia Ransom, 1907
- Durettestrongylus Guerrero, 1983
- Filarinema Mönnig, 1929
- Gazellostrongylus Yeh, 1956
- Graphidiella Olsen, 1948
- Graphidioides Cameron, 1923
- Graphidium Railliet & Henry, 1909
- Graphinema Guerrero & Rojas, 1969
- Haemonchus Cobb, 1898
- Hamulonema Hoberg & Abrams, 2008
- Heligosomoides
- Hexapapillostomum Lomakin, 1991
- Hoazinstrongylus Magalhães Pinto & Corrêa Gomes, 1985
- Hyostrongylus Hall, 1921
- Impalaia Mönnig, 1923
- Lagostonema Sutton & Durette-Desset, 1987
- Laurostrongylus Durette-Desset & Chabaud, 1992
- Libyostrongylus Lane, 1923
- Linustrongylus Vaucher & Durette-Desset, 1986
- Longistrongylus Le Roux, 1931
- Mainspinostrongyius Kalyankar & Palladwar, 1989
- Marshallagia Orloff, 1933
- Mecistocirrus Railliet & Henry, 1912
- Megacooperia Khalil & Gibbons, 1976
- Minutostrongylus Leroux, 1936
- Neocooperia Fotedar & Bambroo, 1971
- Nicollina Baylis, 1930
- Obeliscoides Graybill, 1924
- Ostertagia Ransom, 1907
- Paracooperia Travassos, 1935
- Paracooperioides Boomker, Horak & de Vos, 1981
- Paralibyostrongylus Ortlepp, 1939
- Paramidostomum Freitas & Mendonça, 1950
- Pararhabdonema Kreis, 1945
- Peramelistrongylus Mawson, 1960
- Profilarinema Durette-Desset & Beveridge, 1981
- Pseudostertagia Orloff, 1933
- Quasiamidostomum Lomakin, 1991
- Robustostrongylus Hoberg, Abrams & Pilitt, 2009
- Sahaynema Lakshmipyari & Gambhir, 2013
- Shikhobalovia Ali & Deshpande, 1969
- Spiculopteragia Orloff, 1933
- Teladorsagia Andreeva & Satubaldin, 1954
- Teporingonema Harris, 1985
- Travassosius Khalil, 1922
- Travassostrongylus Orloff, 1933
- Trichostrongyella Dikov, 1961
- Trichostrongylus Looss, 1905
- Websternema Vaucher & Durette-Desset, 1986
