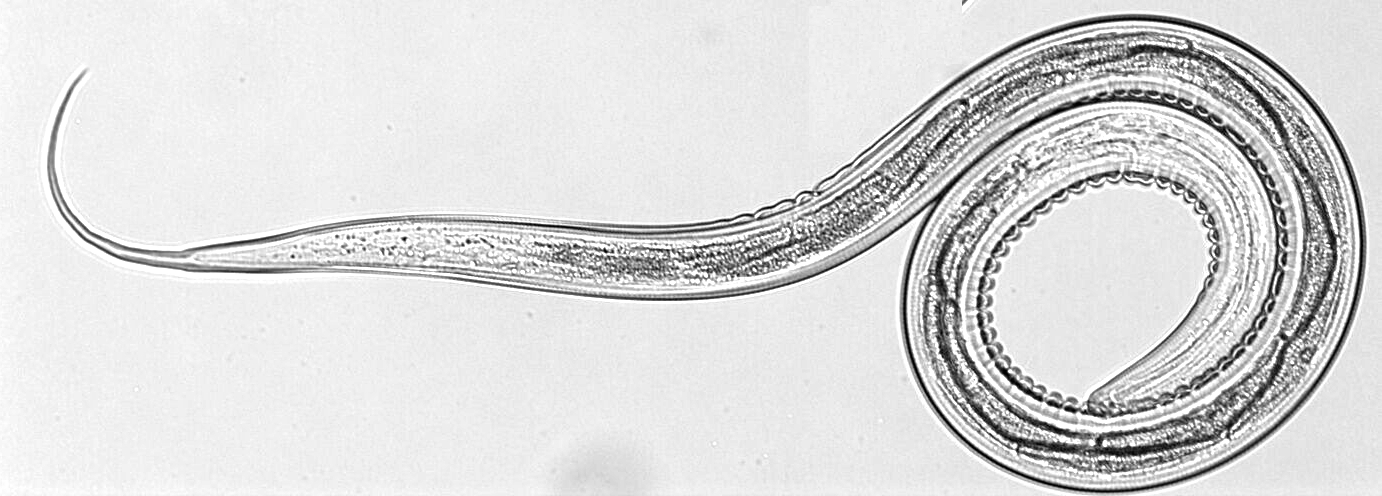
- L3 stage larva of Cooperia oncophora. Courtesy of Russell Avramenko.

Scientific classification
- Kingdom: Animalia
- Phylum: Nematoda
- Class: Chromadorea
- Order: Rhabditida
- Family: Diplogastridae
- Genus: Cooperia; Ransom, 1907

Species
- Cooperia asamati Spiridonov, 1985; Cooperia bisonis Cram, 1925; Cooperia curticei (Giles, 1892); Cooperia mcmasteri Gordon, 1932; Cooperia oncophora (Railliet, 1898) (type); Cooperia pectinata Ransom, 1907; Cooperia punctata (Linstow, 1907); Cooperia surnabada Antipin, 1931

= Cooperia (nematode) =

Genus of roundworms

Cooperia is a genus of nematode from the Cooperiidae family that is one of the most common intestinal parasitic nematodes in cattle in temperate regions. Infections with Cooperia may result in mild clinical symptoms, but can lead to weight loss and damage of the small intestine, especially when co-infections with other nematodes such as Ostertagia ostertagi occur. Infections are usually treated with broad-spectrum anthelmintics such as benzimidazole, but resistance to these drugs has developed in the last decades and is now very common. Cooperia has a direct life cycle. Infective larvae are ingested by the host. The larvae grow to adults, which reproduce in the small intestines. Eggs are shed onto the pasture with the faeces, which leads to new infections. Co-infections with other gastro-intestinal nematodes such as O. ostertagi and Haemonchus contortus are common.
