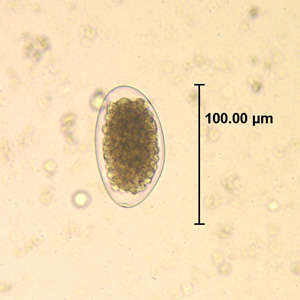
- Egg of Trichostrongylus sp.

Scientific classification
- Kingdom: Animalia
- Phylum: Nematoda
- Class: Chromadorea
- Order: Rhabditida
- Family: Trichostrongylidae
- Genus: Trichostrongylus; Looss, 1905

Species
- Trichostrongylus affinis; Trichostrongylus sigmodontis; Trichostrongylus tenuis; Trichostrongylus retortaeformis; more species in the article

= Trichostrongylus =

Genus of roundworms

Trichostrongylus species are nematodes (round worms), which are ubiquitous among herbivores worldwide, including cattle, sheep, donkeys, goats, deer, and rabbits. At least 10 Trichostrongylus species have been associated with human infections. Infections occur via ingestion of infective larvae from contaminated vegetables or water. Epidemiological studies indicate a worldwide distribution of Trichostrongylus infections in humans, with the highest prevalence rates observed in individuals from regions with poor sanitary conditions, in rural areas, or who are farmers / herders. Human infections are most prevalent in the Middle East and Asia, with a worldwide estimated prevalence of 5.5 million people.

== Life cycle ==
Eggs are passed through the feces of an infected definitive host, usually a mammalian herbivore including rabbits, sheep, cattle, and rodents. Under certain environmental conditions, which include optimal temperature and humidity, larvae hatch from eggs after several days. Hatched rhabditiform larvae grow on vegetation or within soil. After 5 to 10 days, two molts (L1 & L2) have occurred and the parasite becomes a filariform (L3) larvae that is infectious. Infection in mammals occurs upon ingestion of infective filariform (L3) larvae. The larvae reaches the small intestine to reside and mature into adult worms within their definitive hosts. Infections in humans may occur as incidental infections. Trichostrongylus consists of multiple species that relate to each of its host, when it comes to parasitic survival and infection. For example, Trichostrongylus affinis primarily infects cottontail rats, Trichostrongylus sigmodontis affects hispid cotton rat, and marsh rice rat, and Trichostrongylus retortaeformis primarily affects European rabbits (Oryctolagus cuniculus).

== Clinical presentation ==
The majority of human infections are asymptomatic or associated with mild symptoms. Symptomatic individuals may experience abdominal pain, nausea, diarrhea, flatulence, dizziness, generalized fatigue, and malaise. Eosinophilia is frequently observed. Infections with a heavy worm burden can lead to anemia, cholecystitis, and emaciation. Regarding Trichostrongylus retortaeformis, worm burden is affected parallel to host immune system and climate change. Although immunity prevents any significant long-term net accumulation of T. retortaeformis in the rabbit population, its seasonal effect is to increase heterogeneity in infection and transmission between individuals by worsening the parasite burden in the juveniles exposed to climate warming.

== Diagnosis ==
The adult worms live in the small intestine. The diagnosis is based on the observation of eggs in the stool. The eggs are 85–115 um, oval, elongated, and pointed at one or both ends. Trichostrongylus eggs must be differentiated from hookworm eggs, which are smaller and do not have pointed ends.

== Prevention and treatment ==
Since the use of herbivore manure as fertilizer is a common practice preceding infection, thorough cleaning and cooking of vegetables is required for prevention of infection. Treatment with pyrantel pamoate is recommended as the first line drug. Alternative agents include mebendazole and albendazole. Successful treatment with ivermectin has also been reported. Another way of avoiding these free-swimming stages of infective larvae, is to wear protective footwear when walking in areas of parasite prominence, and maintain general sanitary practices throughout the day.

== Species ==
Species:

- Trichostrongylus affinis
- Trichostrongylus andreevi Grigorian, 1952
- Trichostrongylus askivali Dunn, 1964
- Trichostrongylus axei (Cobbold, 1879)
- Trichostrongylus brevis Otsuru, 1962
- Trichostrongylus calcaratus Ransom, 1911
- Trichostrongylus capricola Ransom, 1907
- Trichostrongylus colubriformis (Giles, 1892)
- Trichostrongylus duretteae Rossin, Timi & Malizia, 2006
- Trichostrongylus lerouxi Biocca, Chabaud & Ghadirian, 1974
- Trichostrongylus longispicularis Gordon, 1933
- Trichostrongylus medius Oliger, 1950
- Trichostrongylus ostertagiaeformis Kadenazii, 1957
- Trichostrongylus pietersei Le Roux, 1932
- Trichostrongylus probolurus (Railliet, 1896)
- Trichostrongylus retortaeformis (Zeder, 1800)
- Trichostrongylus sigmodontis
- Trichostrongylus skrjabini Kalantarian, 1928
- Trichostrongylus suis Iwanitzki, 1930
- Trichostrongylus tenuis (Mehlis, 1846)
- Trichostrongylus ventricosus (Rudolphi, 1809)
- Trichostrongylus vitrinus Looss, 1905
