= Ostertagia =

Scientific classification
- Domain: Eukaryota
- Kingdom: Animalia
- Phylum: Nematoda
- Class: Chromadorea
- Order: Rhabditida
- Family: Trichostrongylidae
- Genus: Ostertagia; Ransom, 1907

Genus of roundworms

Ostertagia is a genus of nematodes belonging to the family Trichostrongylidae.

The genus has cosmopolitan distribution.

Species:

- Ostertagia antipini Matschulsky, 1950
- Ostertagia arctica Mitzkewisch, 1929
- Ostertagia buriatica Konstantinowa, 1933
- Ostertagia dahurica Orloff, Belowa & Gnedina, 1931
- Ostertagia drozdzi Jancev, 1977
- Ostertagia gruehneri Skrjabin, 1929
- Ostertagia kolchida Popova, 1937
- Ostertagia lasensis Asadov, 1953
- Ostertagia leptospicularis Asadov, 1953
- Ostertagia lyrataeformis (Drozdz, 1965)
- Ostertagia mossi Dikmans, 1931
- Ostertagia murmani Tachistov, 1940
- Ostertagia nemorhaedi Schults & Kadenatsii, 1950
- Ostertagia orloffi Sankin, 1930
- Ostertagia ostertagi (Stiles, 1892)
- Ostertagia skrjabini (Schulz, Andreeva & Kadenatsii, 1954)
- Ostertagia trifurcata Ransom, 1907
- Ostertagia volgaensis Tomskich, 1938
