= Haemonchus =

Scientific classification
- Domain: Eukaryota
- Kingdom: Animalia
- Phylum: Nematoda
- Class: Chromadorea
- Order: Rhabditida
- Family: Trichostrongylidae
- Genus: Haemonchus; Cobb, 1898

Genus of roundworms

Haemonchus is a genus of nematodes belonging to the family Trichostrongylidae.

They are abomasal parasites that cause anemia, followed by white eye disease.

The genus has cosmopolitan distribution.

Species:

- Haemonchus contortus (Rudolphi, 1803)
- Haemonchus longistipes
- Haemonchus placei (Place, 1893)
- Haemonchus similis Travassos, 1914
