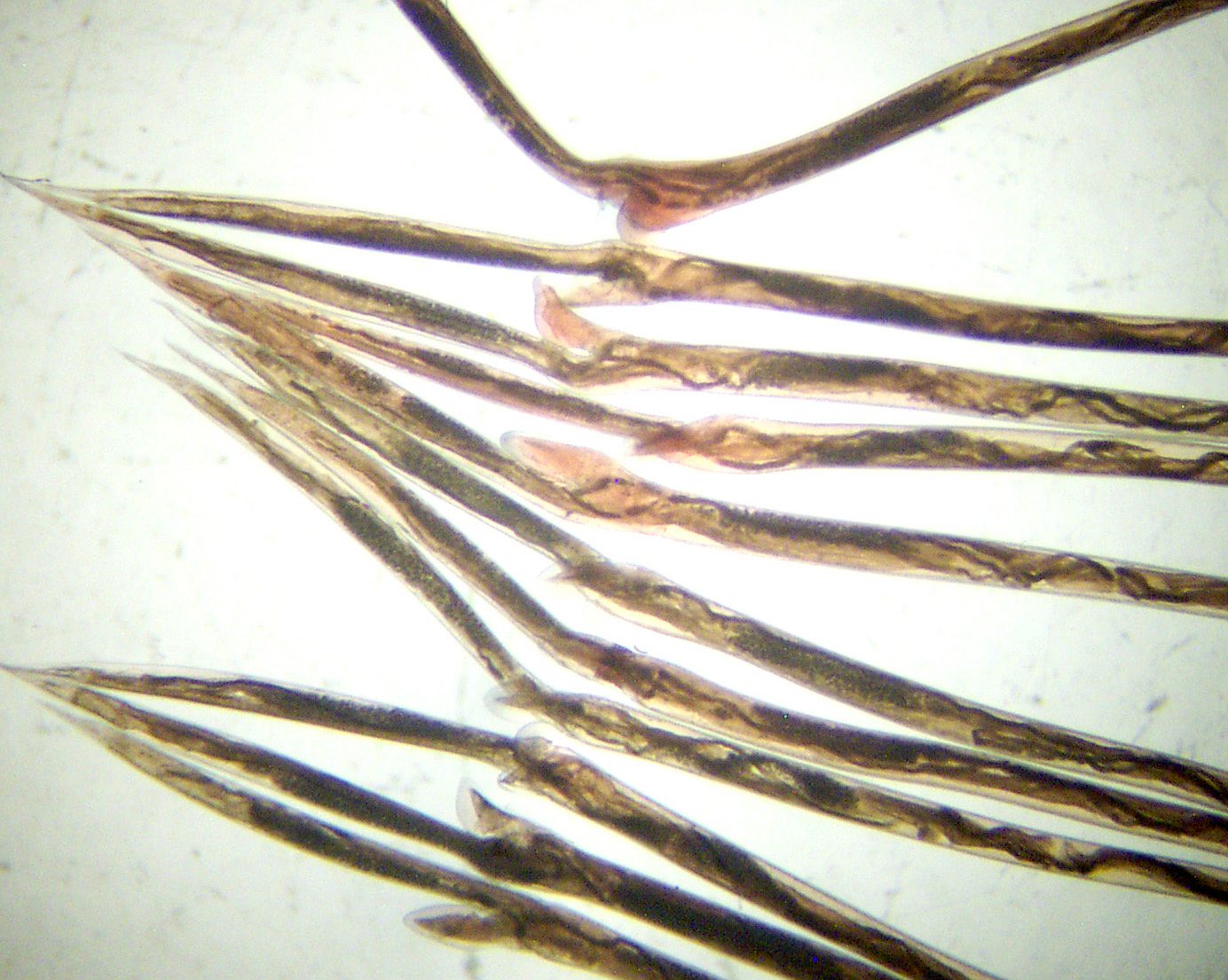
- These 11 Haemonchus contortus adult females were taken from one sheep infected with a single strain of this worm species.
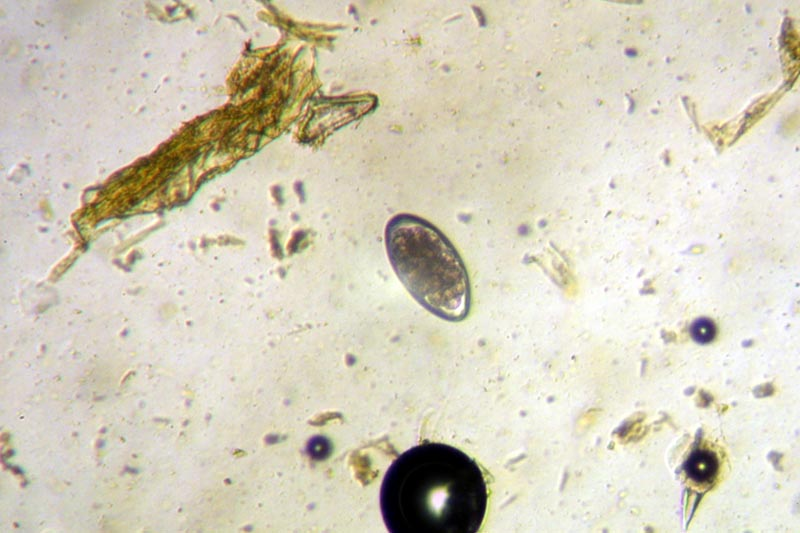
- Haemonchus contortus egg

Scientific classification
- Kingdom: Animalia
- Phylum: Nematoda
- Class: Chromadorea
- Order: Rhabditida
- Family: Trichostrongylidae
- Genus: Haemonchus
- Species: H. contortus

Binomial name
- Haemonchus contortus (Rudolphi, 1803) Cobb, 1898

Synonyms
- Haemonchus placei Place, 1893 (closely related species)

= Haemonchus contortus =

Species of roundworm

Haemonchus contortus, also known as the barberpole worm, is a very common parasite and one of the most pathogenic nematodes of ruminants. Adult worms attach to abomasal mucosa and feed on the blood. This parasite is responsible for anemia, oedema, and death of infected sheep and goats, mainly during summer in warm, humid climates.

Females may lay over 10,000 eggs a day, which pass from the host animal in the faeces. After hatching from their eggs, H. contortus larvae molt several times, resulting in an L3 form that is infectious for the animals. The host ingests these larvae when grazing. The L4 larvae, formed after another molt, and adult worms suck blood in the abomasum of the animal, potentially giving rise to anaemia and oedema, which eventually can lead to death.

The infection, called haemonchosis, causes large economic losses for farmers around the world, especially for those living in warmer climates. Anthelminthics are used to prevent and treat these, and other, worm infections, but resistance of the parasites against these chemicals is growing. Some breeds, such as the West African Dwarf goat and N'Dama cattle, are more resistant than other breeds to H. contortus (haemonchotolerance).

== Morphology ==
The ova is yellowish in color. The egg is about 70–85 μm long by 44 μm wide, and the early stages of cleavage contain between 16 and 32 cells. The adult female is 18–30 millimetres (3/4–1 1/8 in) long and is easily recognized by its trademark "barber pole" coloration. The red and white appearance is because H. contortus is a blood feeder, and the white ovaries can be seen coiled around the blood-filled intestine. The male adult worm is much smaller at 10–20 millimetres (3/8–13/16 in) long, and displays the distinct feature of a well-developed copulatory bursa, containing an asymmetrical dorsal lobe and a Y-shaped dorsal ray.

== Life cycle ==
The adult female worm can release between 5,000 and 10,000 eggs, which are passed out in the faeces. Eggs then develop in moist conditions in the faeces and continue to develop into the L1 (rhabditiform), and L2 juvenile stages by feeding on bacteria in the dung. The L1 stage usually occurs within four to six days under the optimal conditions of 24–29 °C (75–84 °F). The L2 rhabditform sheds its cuticle and then develops into the L3 filiariform infective larvae. The L3 form has a protective cuticle, but under dry, hot conditions, survival is reduced. Sheep, goats, and other ruminants become infected when they graze and ingest the L3 infective larvae. The infective larvae pass through the first three stomach chambers to reach the abomasum. There, the L3 shed their cuticles and burrow into the internal layer of the abomasum, where they develop into L4, usually within 48 hours, or preadult larvae. The L4 larvae then molt and develop into the L5 adult form. The male and female adults mate and live in the abomasum, where they feed on blood.

== Genetics ==
The H. contortus draft genome was published in 2013. Further work to complete the reference genome is underway at the Wellcome Trust Sanger Institute in collaboration with the University of Calgary, the University of Glasgow, and the Moredun Research Institute. Developing genetic and genomic resources for this parasite will facilitate the identification of the genetic changes conferring anthelmintic resistance and may help design new drugs or vaccines to combat disease and improve animal health.

The H. contortus reference genome was published at chromosome-scale in 2020. 5 autosomes and one X chromosome were assembled. Quite remarkably, each chromosome had a very similar gene content compared to the corresponding chromosome in C. elegans, yet there was little conservation of gene order. This genome is the fourth version from Wellcome Sanger.

== Pathogenicity ==
Clinical signs are largely due to blood loss. Sudden death may be the only observation in acute infection, while other common clinical signs include pallor, anemia, oedema, ill thrift, lethargy, and depression. The accumulation of fluid in the submandibular tissue, a phenomenon commonly called "bottle jaw", may be seen. Growth and production are significantly reduced.

== Prevention and treatment ==
Prophylactic anthelmintic treatment necessary to prevent infection in endemic regions, but wherever possible, a reduction on reliance on chemical treatment is warranted given the rapid rise of anthelmintic resistance. A commercial vaccine known as Barbervax in Australia or Wirevax in South Africa has become available in recent years. This works mainly by reducing egg output and hence pasture contamination. The vaccine contains proteins from the lining of the intestines of the Barber's Pole worm. The animal produces antibodies against the protein which circulate in the blood. When the Barber's pole worm drinks the blood the antibodies attach to its stomach lining, preventing digestion and starving the animal. Following this, the worm produces fewer eggs and eventually dies off.

Targeted selective treatment methods such as the FAMACHA method may be valuable in reducing the number of dosing intervals, thus reducing the percentage of surviving parasites that are resistant to anthelmintics. Faecal egg counts are used to track parasite infestation levels, individual animals' susceptibility, and anthelmintic effectiveness.

Other management strategies include selective breeding for more parasite-resistant sheep or goats (e.g. by culling the most susceptible animals or by introducing parasite-resistant breeds such as Gulf Coast Native sheep); careful pasture management, such as managed intensive rotational grazing, especially during peak parasite season; and "cleaning" infested pastures by haying, tilling, or grazing with a nonsusceptible species (e.g. swine or poultry).

Recent research has also shown that the use of hair sheep breeds, such as Katahdins, Dorpers, and St. Croix, can be chosen for resistance to internal parasites for economical standards; additionally, the hair breeds provide resistance without showing any significant effect growth performance of their progeny.

One of the riskiest methods that can be used for treatments is the use of copper oxide wire particles (COWP) to aid in the destruction of the parasites inside the gut without the use of organic chemicals. However, in sheep, the dosing would need to be monitored extremely closely because if they are administered too high of a dose, then they will slip into copper toxicity. For the COWP, the lowest recommended dose would need to be administered to remain safe for sheep. The study conducted found that treatment with the COWP reduced faecal egg counts by >85%. Treatment with the copper oxide wire particles could lead to less reliance on anthelmintics because the COWP allows for the reduction in establishment of parasitic infections, especially if the producer is trying to reduce the larval population on their pastures.

Recent research shows fungal lectins are able to inhibit larval development. These fungal lectins are Corprinopsis cinerea lectins - CCL2, CGL2; Aleuria aurantia lectin - AAL; and Marasmius oreades agglutinin - MOA. These four toxic lectins bind to specific glycan structures found in H. controtus. Some of these glycan structures might represent antigens which are not exposed to host immune system, and thus have potential for vaccine or drug development.
