= Parasitic bronchitis =

Disease of livestock caused by lungworms

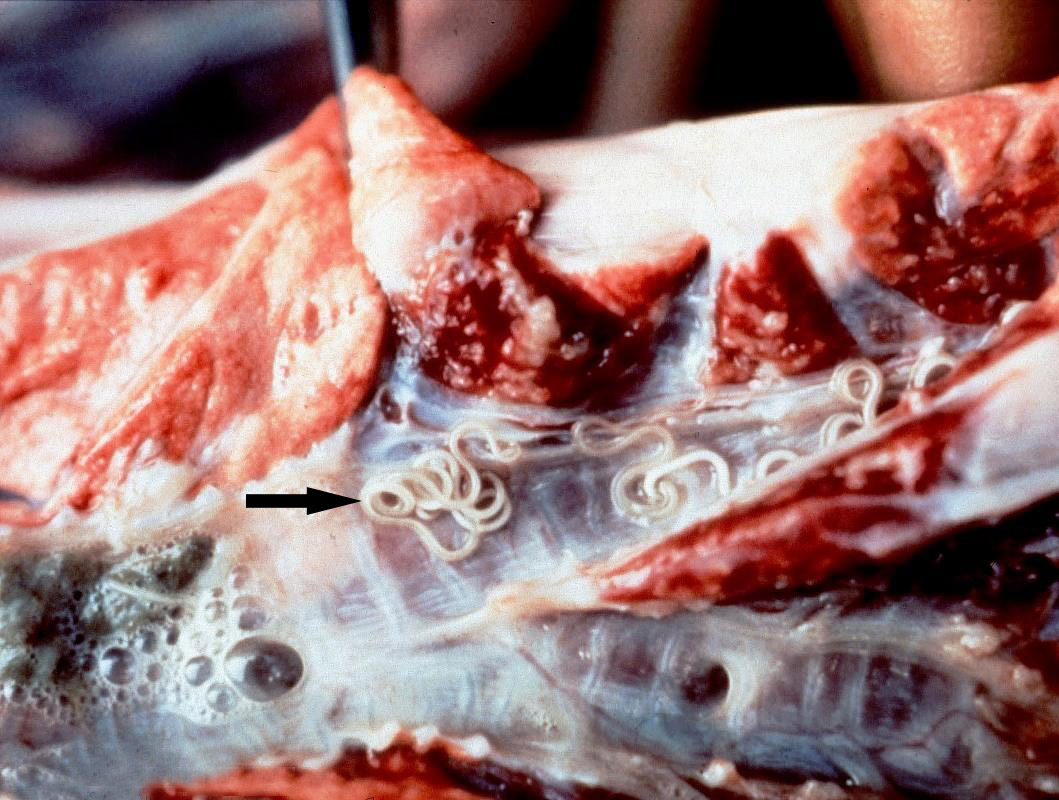
Dictyocaulus viviparus found in the bronchi of a calf during necropsy (arrow)

Parasitic bronchitis, also known as hoose, husk, or verminous bronchitis, is a disease of sheep, cattle, goats, and swine caused by the presence of various species of parasite, commonly known as lungworms, in the bronchial tubes or in the lungs. It is marked by cough, dyspnea, anorexia and constipation. Lungworms that cause parasitic bronchitis include nematodes of the genera Dictyocaulus, Metastrongylus, and Protostrongylus. Hoose is essentially an infantile disease, almost always afflicting animals under one year of age.

It can be diagnosed through fecal examination or taking a sputum sample and treated by killing the nematode larvae and adults. In severe cases, additional antibiotics may be needed. The most effective prevention is via vaccination, especially important for cattle.

== Cause ==
The cause for parasitic bronchitis is the nematode called Dictyocaulus viviparus. In the infected animal's fecal matter the larvae later become infective. When animals eat in the infected pasture they ingest the parasite. As the larvae travel towards the respiratory system, they mature, and by the time they reach the lungs, they are full adults. Once they reach the lungs the females lay eggs and once they hatch the new larvae travel up the windpipe to be swallowed and then expelled, repeating the cycle. Some high-risk conditions where D. viviparus is most commonly located are wet pastures with swampy areas, mainly between June and November.

== Symptoms ==
The main symptoms include breathing difficulties and coughing. The respiratory rate will increase and the animal will cough frequently. There can be audible abnormal breathing sounds. Some animals will show major weight loss. In cattle, there will be reduced milk production. When attempting to cough or expel air, the animal will continually take a position where its head, neck, and tongue are stretched out. They can also show a mild to high fever. In severe cases, it could result in the death of the animal.

== Diagnosis ==
When diagnosing parasitic bronchitis, it is mainly based on the symptoms and grazing habits. There are multiple methods to diagnosing parasitic bronchitis. One of which is through fecal examination. Usually, either the Baermann technique or flotation is used. This is to detect any larvae that are in the intestines. Another method is by taking a sputum sample. This is a mixture of saliva and mucus coughed up from the lungs. The sample is then examined for traces of eggs or larvae. This method is more sensitive than a fecal sample. Taking blood or milk samples could also prove the presence of the parasite. By using ELISA tests, any antibodies toward the parasite will be detected.

== Treatment ==
In order to treat the parasite, all forms of anthelmintics are effective in killing both the developing larvae and adult D.viviparus. As soon as an animal is showing symptoms, they should be treated. If they aren't treated before it becomes severe then the animal may not respond to the medicine or if there are very high numbers of parasites then killing them could result in the airways being blocked by the dead larvae. In severe cases, some will require an additional antibiotic.

== Prevention ==
The most effective method to prevent an outbreak is through vaccination. The vaccination includes a small dose of irradiated infectious larvae. This is given orally in two doses four weeks apart. It is important to treat all animals such as cattle. Despite it being effective, small amounts of lungworm can still appear. Some other methods of prevention are avoiding wet pastures, rotating the use of grazing pastures, having a closed herd policy, and preventing any outside exposure.
