= Brain worm =

Brain worm or brainworm may refer to:

== Biology ==
- Parelaphostrongylus tenuis, a nematode parasite common to the white-tailed deer
- Dicrocoelium dendriticum, a parasitic fluke common to cattle
- Elaphostrongylus, a genus of nematode parasites
- Neurocysticercosis, a parasitic infection of the nervous system caused by tapeworm larvae

== Literature ==
- Brainwyrms, a 2023 body horror novel by Alison Rumfitt

== Music ==
- Brain Worms, the third studio album of the Australian rock band RVG
- Earworm, a catchy or memorable piece of music that gets stuck in one's head

== See also ==
- Brain rot
