= Muellerius =

Scientific classification
- Kingdom: Animalia
- Phylum: Nematoda
- Class: Chromadorea
- Order: Rhabditida
- Family: Protostrongylidae
- Genus: Muellerius; Cameron, 1927

Genus of nematode

Muellerius is a genus of parasitic nematodes (roundworms) belonging to the family Protostrongylidae. Species in this genus are commonly known as lungworms and primarily infect small ruminants such as sheep and goats. The most well-known species, Muellerius capillaris, is considered one of the most widespread lungworms of domestic and wild ruminants.

== Morphology ==
Adult Muellerius worms are small, slender nematodes that inhabit the lung parenchyma of their hosts, typically within fibrotic nodules. Unlike some other lungworms, adults are not usually found free in the bronchi. First-stage larvae (L1) possess a characteristic dorsal spine on the tail, which is a key morphological feature used to differentiate Muellerius from other protostrongylid larvae during diagnostic examination.

== Taxonomy and nomenclature ==
Muellerius belongs to the order Strongylida, a group of nematodes characterized by parasitism in the respiratory or gastrointestinal systems of vertebrates.

There are two species assigned to this genus:

- Muellerius capillaris (Müller, 1889)
- Muellerius tenuispiculatus Gebauer, 1932

== See also ==
- Dictyocaulus
