= Protostrongylus shiozawai =

Scientific classification
- Kingdom: Animalia
- Phylum: Nematoda
- Class: Chromadorea
- Order: Rhabditida
- Family: Protostrongylidae
- Genus: Protostrongylus
- Species: P. shiozawai

Binomial name
- Protostrongylus shiozawai Ohbayashi & Ueno, 1974

Species of roundworm

Protostrongylus shiozawai is a parasitic nematode that belongs to the family Protostrongylidae. Japanese serows (Capricornis crispus) are the only animals known to be infected with Protostrongylus shiozawai. P. shiozawai is a parasite that targets the bronchioles, alveolar ducts, and alveoli of the Japanese serow.

== Morphology ==
Adults forms of P. shiozawai are found in the lungs of Japanese serow. The nematodes are thin, long, and delicate. Specimens of P. shiozawai have been often found in fragments in their hosts. Dissection of Japanese serows to obtain samples of the nematode are very carefully done as to not break the worm.

Male forms of P. shiozawai have a body length 24.3-28.4 mm and a maximal width of 0.084-0.104 mm. The esophagus is approximately 0.248-0.280 mm long and 0.028-0.036 mm wide. The males have a short bursa.

The female forms of P. Shiozawai have a posterior body measuring 19mm in length, and a width of approximately 0.104-0.125mm long. Its esophagus measures 0.318-0.326mm long.

== Host ==
The relationship between serow and Protostrongylus shiozawai is highly specific. In a study done by Murakami et al., P. shoizawai were found in over 70% of all wild serows. Upon examination, those infected had had pulmonary lesions caused by this nematode. The lesions were found to be granulomas caused by the serow's immune system.

There is concern about the overlapping serow habitat with sheep. Many other parasitic nematodes belonging to the same genus also parasitize sheep-like animals i.e. P. stilesi and P. rushi in bighorn sheep, P. rufescens in mouflons, and P. rupicaprae in chamois. Though since 1975 P. shiozawai have only been found in serows, further studies are required to study the relationship of P. shiozawai in other animals.
