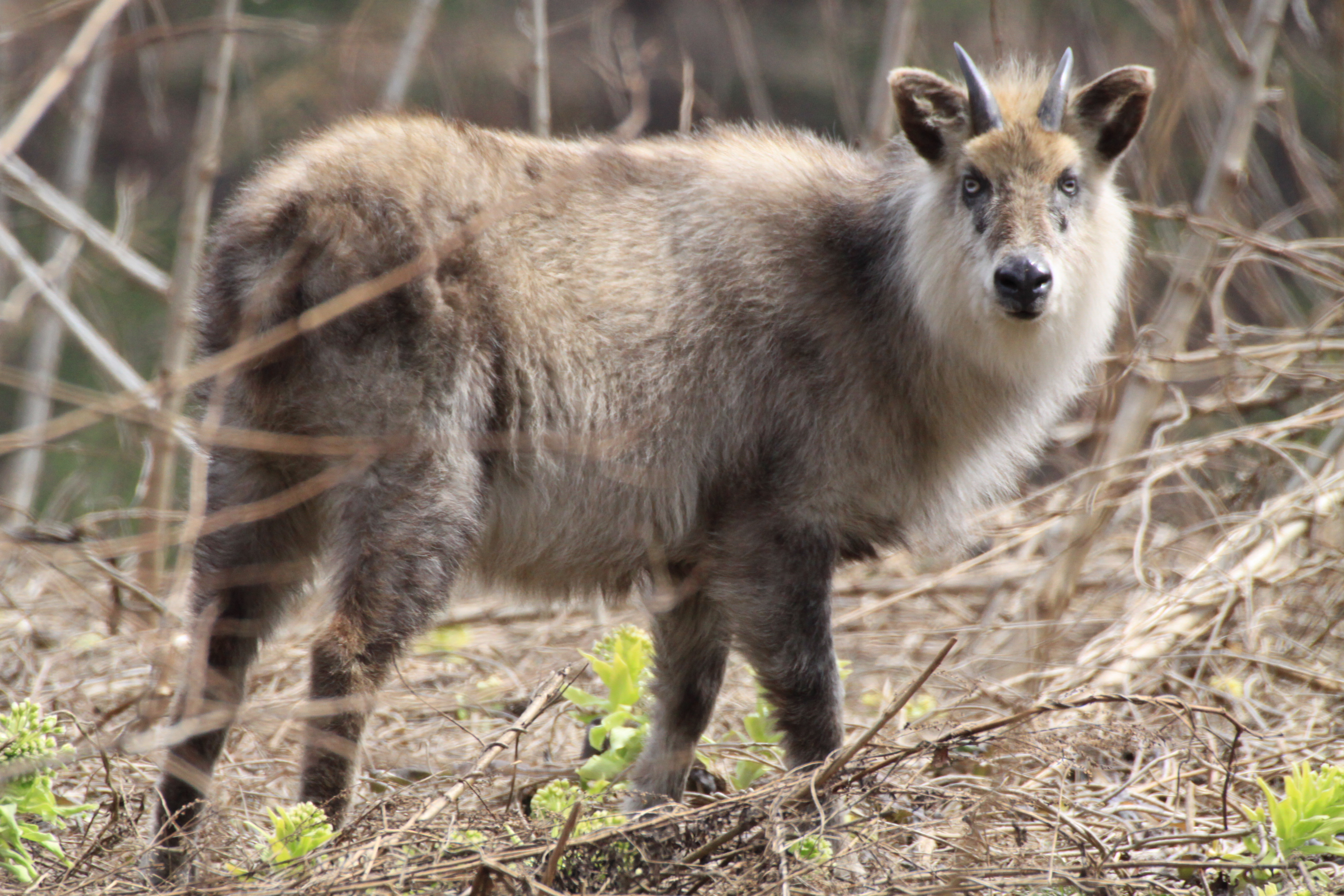
- In the wild of Japan

Conservation status
- Least Concern (IUCN 3.1)

Scientific classification
- Kingdom: Animalia
- Phylum: Chordata
- Class: Mammalia
- Infraclass: Placentalia
- Order: Artiodactyla
- Family: Bovidae
- Subfamily: Caprinae
- Genus: Capricornis
- Species: C. crispus

Binomial name
- Capricornis crispus (R. Swinhoe, 1870)
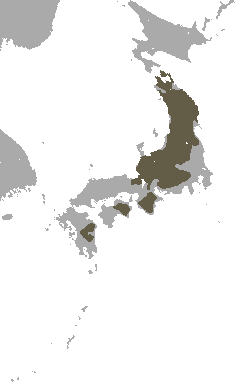

Synonyms
- Antilope crispa Temminck, 1836; Capricornis crispa (Gray, 1846); Capricornulus crispus (Heude, 1898); Capricornulus pryerianus (Heude, 1898); Capricornulus saxicola (Heude, 1898); Naemorhedus crispus (Groves & Grubb, 1985); Nemorhaedus crispus (Grubb, 1993)

= Japanese serow =

Bovid endemic to Japan

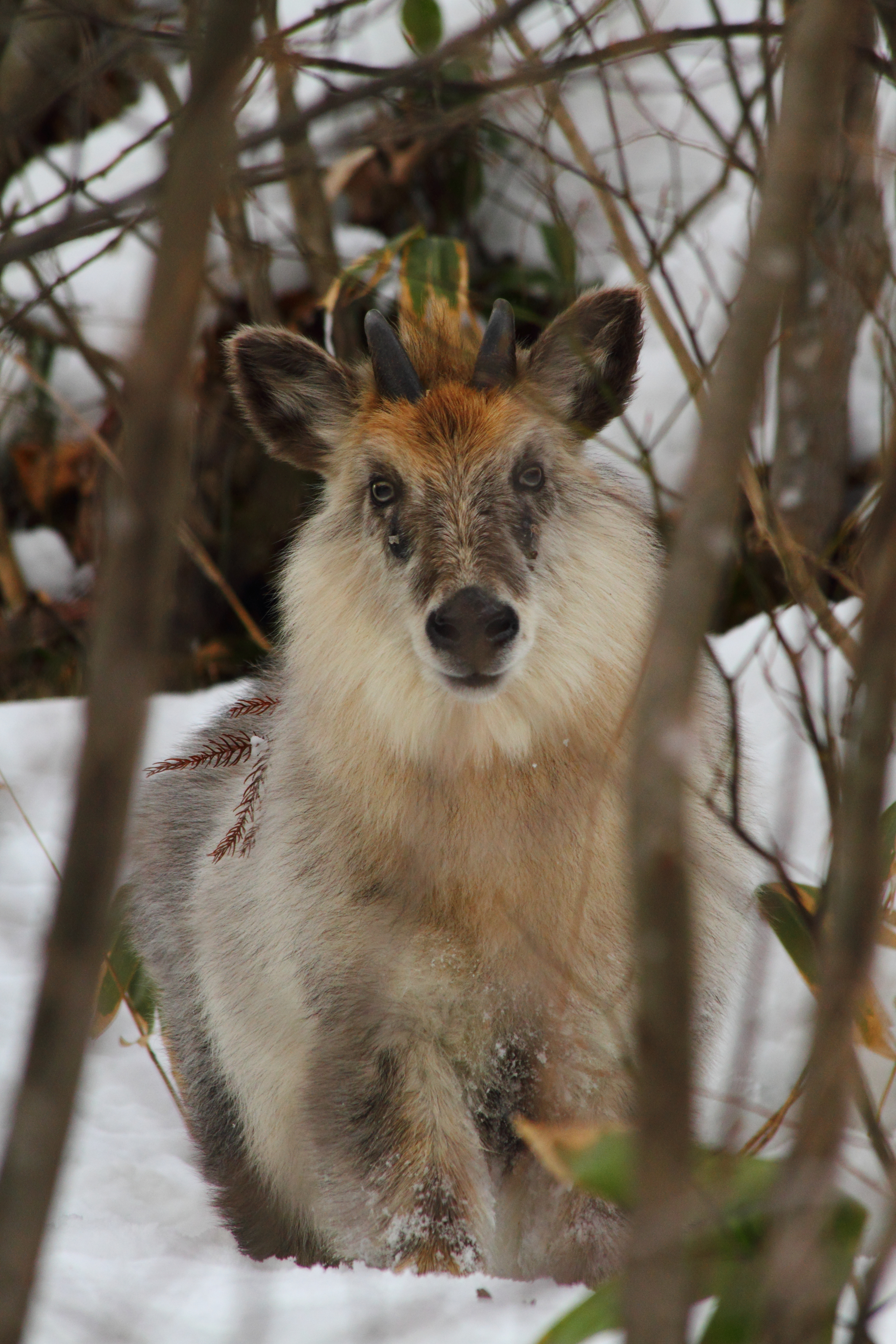
Kamoshika in the wild in Yamadera

The Japanese serow (氈鹿, kamoshika; lit. "coarse pelt deer") (Capricornis crispus) (Note: Japanese serow (Japanese: ニホンカモシカ, Hepburn: Nihon kamoshika)) (羚羊) is a Japanese goat-antelope, an even-toed ungulate. It is found in dense woodland in Japan, primarily in northern and central Honshu. The serow is seen as a national symbol of Japan, and is subject to protection in conservation areas.

Adult Japanese serow stand about 81 centimetres (32 in) tall and weigh 30–45 kg (66–99 lb). They are black to whitish, and colouring lightens in summer. The fur is very bushy, especially the tail. Both sexes have short, backwards-curving horns, and are difficult to distinguish by sight. Japanese serow are found in dense mountain forests where they eat leaves, shoots, and acorns. They are diurnal and feed in early mornings and late afternoons. Serows are solitary, or gather in couples or small family groups. The animal marks its territory with sweet-and-sour-smelling preorbital gland secretions, and males and females have separate territories that may overlap.

In the mid-20th century, the Japanese serow was hunted to near-extinction. In 1955, the Japanese government passed a law designating it a "Special National Monument" to protect it from poachers. Populations have since grown so greatly that the IUCN Red List of Threatened Animals ranks it "least concern". In 1979, complaints from foresters and farmers led to the repeal of the 1955 law. Since then, the serow has had protected status in 13 designated protected areas over 23 prefectures, and has been subject to culling as a pest outside conservation areas. Conservationists have labelled it a "living national treasure of the forest".

== Taxonomy ==
Taxonomically Coenraad Jacob Temminck first described the Japanese serow in 1836, and named it Antilope crispa. John Edward Gray gave it its current name in 1846. (Note: As Capricornis crispa; Robert Swinhoe amended it for gender agreement in 1870.) Pierre Marie Heude proposed many new genera and species in a system published in 1898; Capricornis became Capricornulus, which included crispus, pryerianus, and saxicola. The system did not find acceptance.

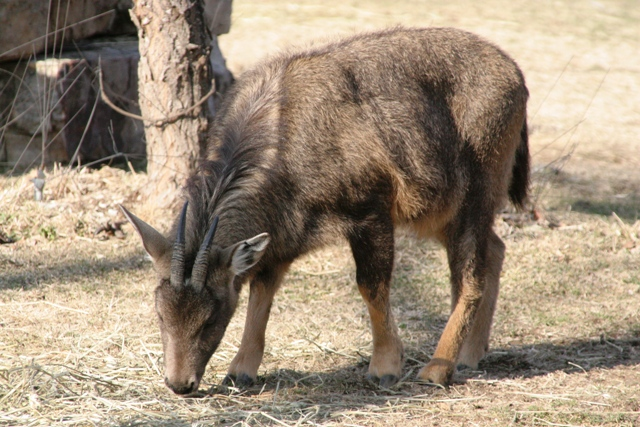
A long-tailed goral (Naemorhedus caudatus). Serows (genus Capricornis) have sometimes been classified with gorals under the genus Naemorhedus.

There is no fossil record of the Japanese serow; its evolutionary history and the closeness of its relation to the Taiwan serow (Capricornis swinhoei) are speculative. Its taxonomic position has led to it being called a "living fossil". Karyotype studies indicate it was the earliest species to split from the common Capricornis ancestor. The closest relative to the Japanese serow is the Taiwan serow (Capricornis swinhoei). Genetically, there is little difference between Japanese and Taiwan serows; their karyotype is essentially the same: 2n=50, FN=60. The Taiwan serow is smaller and shorter-haired, with browner fur and a white patch under the chin and throat.

Phylogenetically, Capricornis is closer to goats and sheep than cattle. The nomenclature and status of Capricornis taxa are not completely resolved. Some researchers have considered Capricornis a junior synonym of Naemorhedus, a classification that includes gorals; molecular analysis has not supported this classification. Capricornis has a lower canine, which Naemorhedus species usually do not.

In Japan, the serow is widely thought of as a kind of deer, though deer and serows are in different families. In the past, the Japanese word kamoshika (Note: In Japanese, the word kamoshika refers both to serow and antelope species.) was written using the Chinese character for shika, meaning "deer". (Note: "Deer" (Japanese: 鹿, Hepburn: shika)) Today, when written using Chinese characters, the characters for "antelope" and "sheep" (Note: Japanese serow ("antelope-sheep") (Japanese: 羚羊, Hepburn: kamoshika)) are used. Sometimes the serow is mistaken for a wild boar.

== Appearance and anatomy ==
The Japanese serow is a small bovid whose displayed morphology is primitive in relation to other bovids. It has a stocky body whose size varies little between sexes or geographic location; it stands about 70–85 cm (28–33 in) tall (70–75 cm (28–30 in) at the shoulder) and weighs 30–50 kg (66–110 lb). The hoof is cloven. Compared to mainland serow, the ears are shorter and the coat is typically longer and woollier—about 10 cm (3.9 in) on the body. It has a bushy tail of 6–6.5 cm (2.4–2.6 in) and no mane.

Its fur is whitish around the neck, and fur on the body may be black, black with a dorsal white spot, dark brown, or whitish. The coat lightens in summer. There are three well-developed skin glands: large preorbital glands in both sexes, which increase in size as the animal ages; poorly developed interdigital glands in all four legs; and preputial glands. The adult's 32 permanent teeth form by 30 months, and have a dental formula of 0.0.3.33.1.3.3. The inner sides of the teeth become blackened with a hard-to-remove substance, likely tree resin. The tongue has a V-shaped apex.

(video) An adult lays down to rest.

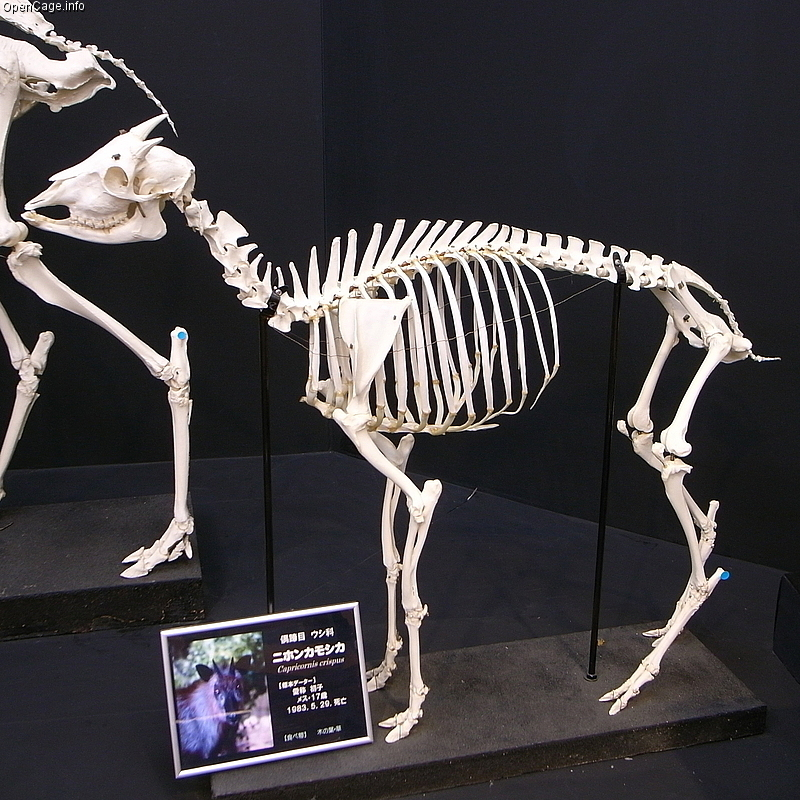
Capricornis crispus skeleton at the Ōji Zoo in Kobe, Japan

Differentiation between the sexes is not well developed; body size, growth, survival, and feeding habits show negligible difference. Both sexes have short, backwards-curving horns measuring 12–16 cm (4.7–6.3 in); (Note: A mean of 14.5 centimetres (5.7 in) for 30 males and 13.7 centimetres (5.4 in) for 30 females was found in a 1985 study at Gifu University.) the sheaths have a series of transverse rings. Horns begin to develop at about four months and continue to grow throughout the lifespan.

Environment affects the size of the first growth ring. Size, curvature, and thickness and number of transverse rings are indicative of age. Up to two years, there are thicker transverse rings, of greater length and flexion than in adults. Into adulthood, thinner horn rings force the thick transverse rings upward. Growth increment slows earlier in maturation in females than in males. Researchers use genitalia and sexual behaviour to distinguish the sexes. Females have two pairs of mammae.

Hearing is sensitive and eyesight is strong—the serow is able to detect and react to movement from a distance, and it can see well in low lighting. Sense of smell is also strong, and the serow can be observed raising its head and sniffing the air around it.

== Distribution, ecology, and behaviour ==
Capricornis crispus is the only wild bovine ruminant in Japan, and is endemic to three of the four main islands of Japan: primarily northern and central Honshu, and small areas in Shikoku and Kyushu. It can tolerate colder, snowier climates better than mainland serows. The animal is found solitary, in pairs, or in small family groups in open grassland and forests at an elevation of about 1 km (0.62 mi), and uses caves to rest in. It prefers temperate deciduous forest, but also lives in broad-leaved or subalpine coniferous forest made up of Japanese beech, Japanese oak, alpine meadow, and coniferous plantations. Population density is low, at an average of 2.6 per square kilometre (6.7/sq mi), and no greater than 20 per square kilometre (52/sq mi).

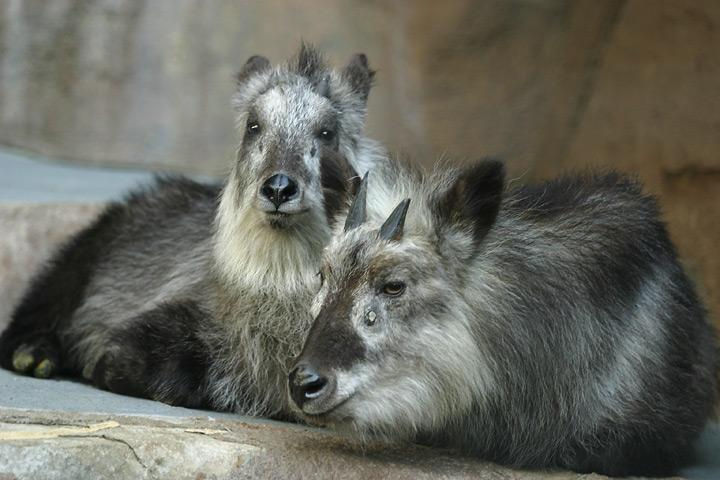
Japanese serows live alone or in small family groups.

C. crispus is philopatric and territorial, and marks trees with sweet-sour-smelling preorbital gland secretions to indicate its territory. Males and females establish separate, overlapping ranges, typically 10–15 ha (25–37 acres), but the male's is typically larger than the female's. Aggression is rare, but the serow may react with hostility to territorial breaches. Due to the extinction of its once-primary predator, the Japanese wolf, the Japanese black bear is its only predator. It flees with a whistling snort when it detects danger. It is an agile, sure-footed mountain dweller that is able to sprint up mountains and to jump from cliff to cliff to safety; hunters have likened this display of agility to the ninja.

The diurnal Japanese serow is a browser that feeds in early morning and late afternoon, primarily on fleshy or coniferous leaves, plant shoots, and acorns. It feeds on alder, sedge, Japanese witch-hazel (Hamamelis japonica), and Japanese cedar. It adjusts its diet to what food is locally available, and, as a ruminant, the serow has a four-chambered stomach. Studies indicate that even severe winters have a negligible impact on the serow's food intake, suggesting that, given its solitary social structure, it selects its territory to ensure sufficient food supply. Defecation occurs in set locations.

Life expectancies may be up to 20–25 years. (Note: Estimates place life expectancy at birth at 4.8–6.5 years,) Parapoxvirus is common, though rarely fatal; infection causes papular and nodular lesions. There have been epidemics of contagious pustular dermatitis. Bacteria such as E. coli and Lyme borreliosis are common, and Toxoplasma gondii has been reported. C. crispus is susceptible to numerous parasites, such as the nematode Trichuris discolor and the lungworm Protostrongylus shiozawai.

=== Reproduction ===
Capricornis crispus is socially monogamous. (Note: Although the Japanese serow is generally monogamous, a 1996 study showed that 20% of males to be polygynous with two females.) Females reach sexual maturity at 30 months. First breeding takes place at age 2.5–3 years; breeding occurs once a year, between September and January. In a courtship ritual resembling that of goats or gazelles, the male Japanese serow licks the female's mouth, strikes her on the hindlegs with his forelegs, and rubs her genitalia with his horns. Both sexes display Flehmen responses.

Birth takes place between June and August after a gestation period of about 210–220 days. It takes about half an hour, and the female walks about during the birth. The single fawn is 30 cm (1 ft) tall and reaches adult height in a year. The fawn stays with its mother for 1–2 years. It then moves gradually from its mother's range until it establishes its own. Young that do not disperse on their own may be chased away by the mother.

C. crispus in its natural habitat

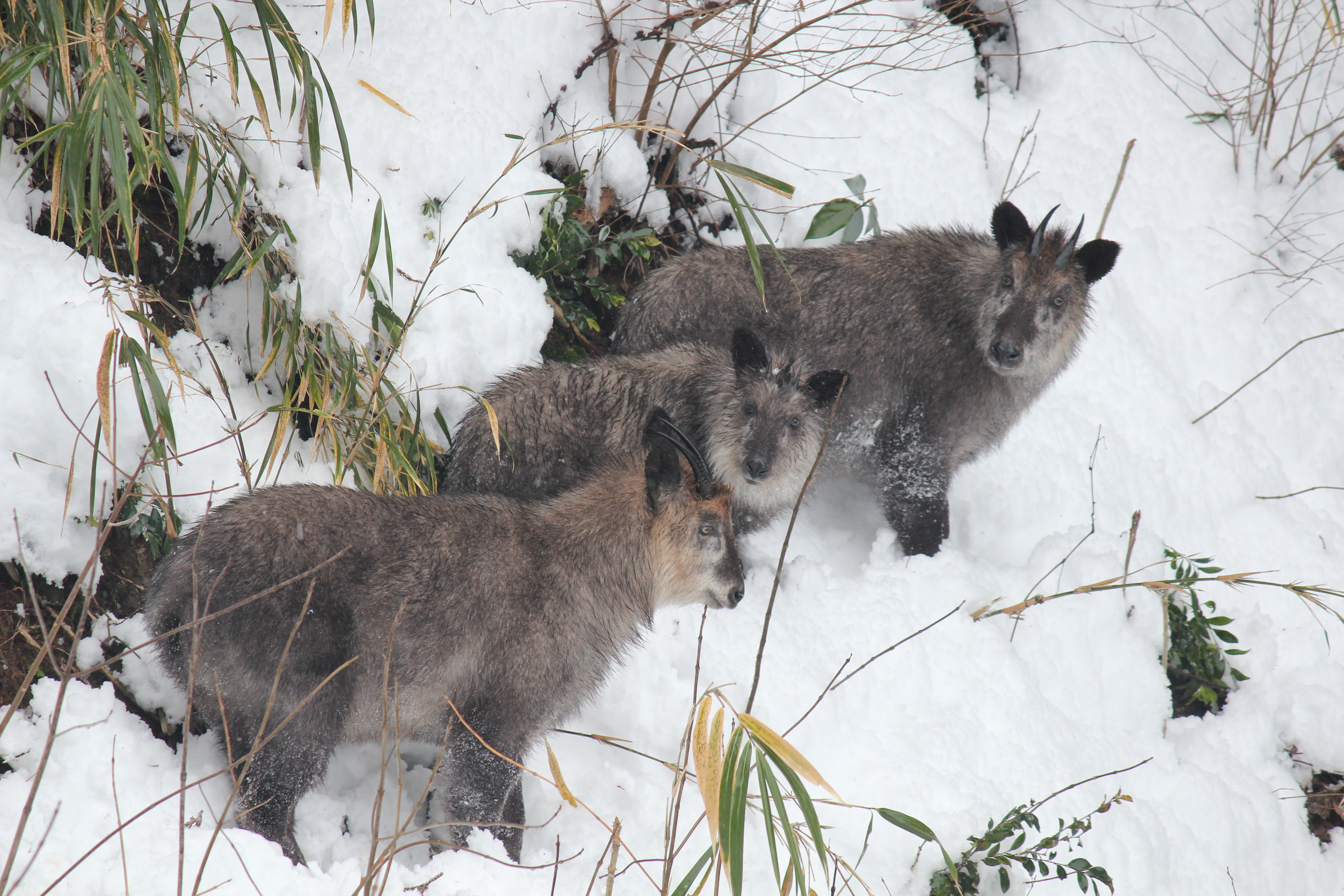
Three sure-footed C. crispus on a snowy incline

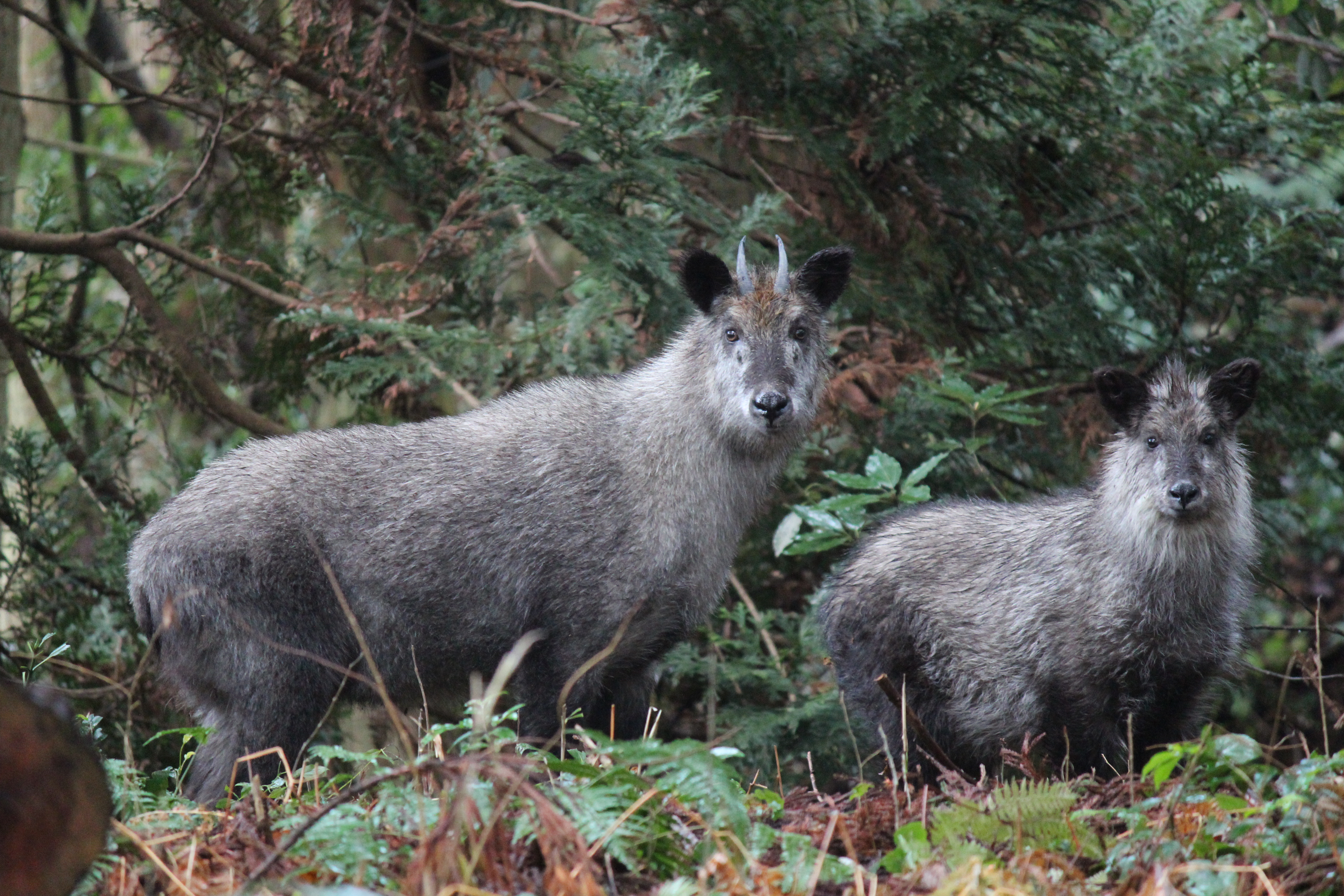
C. crispus mother and child

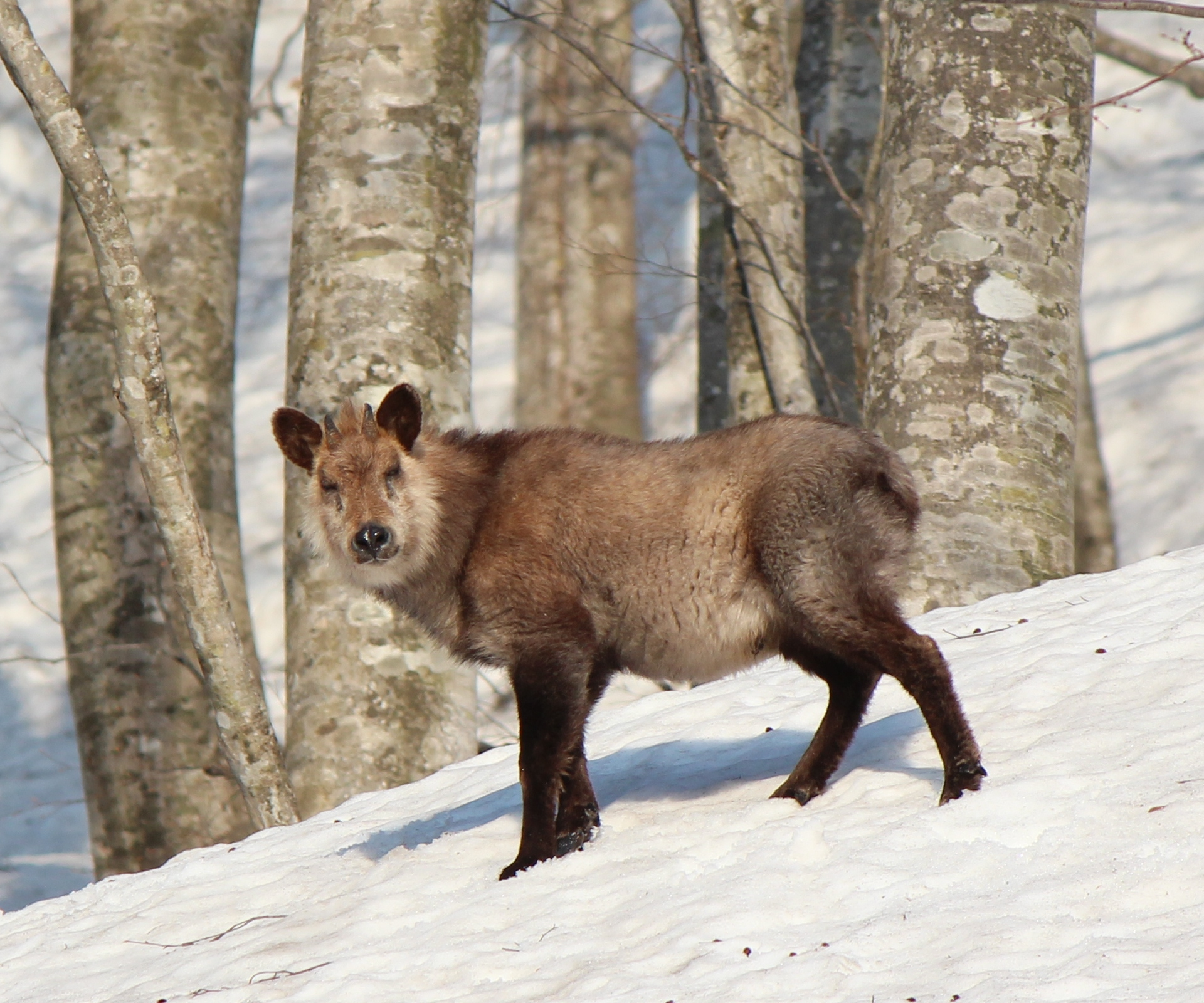
A C. crispus on Mount Sanpōiwa in the Ryōhaku Mountains

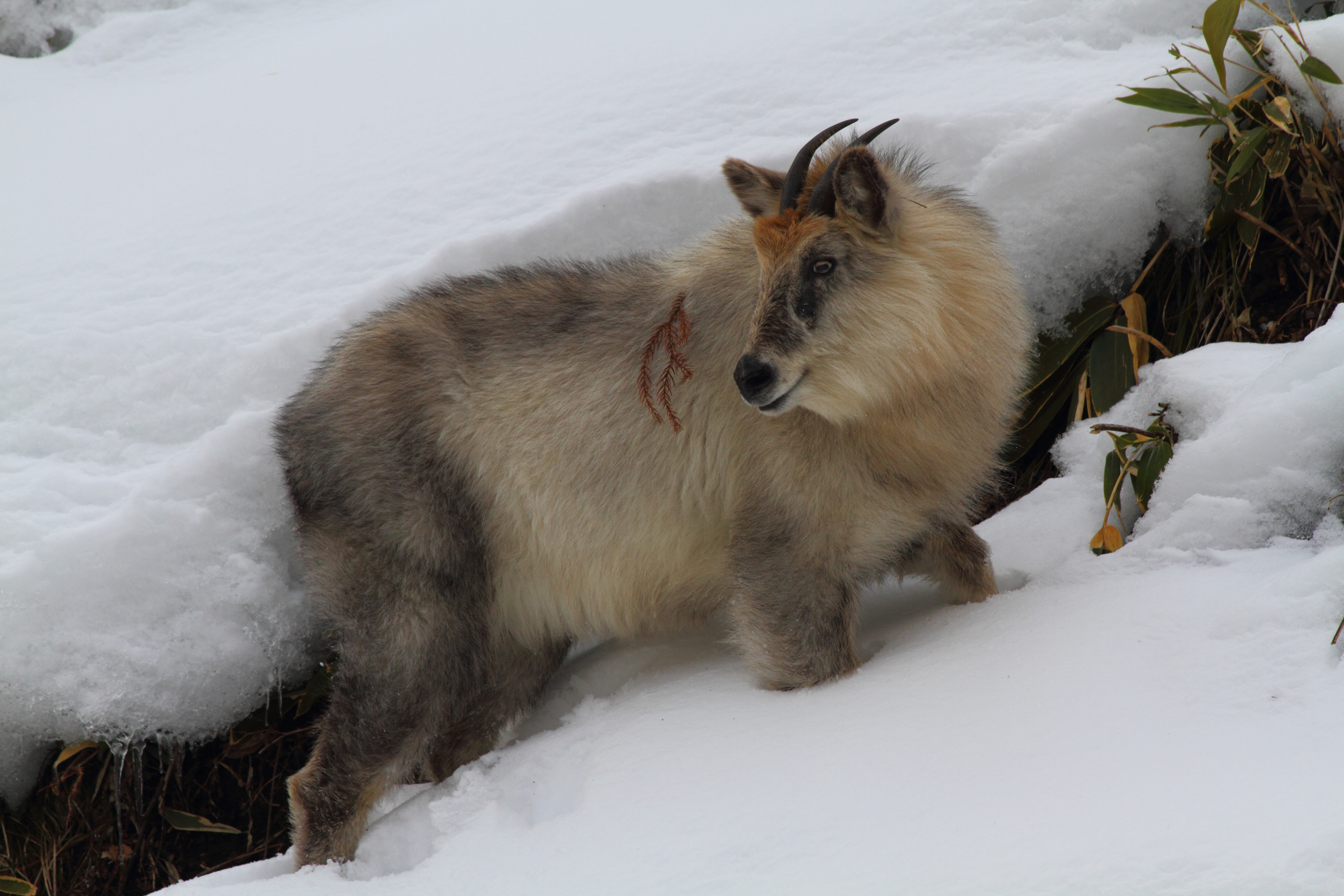
C. crispus near Rissyakuji Temple

== Relationship with humans ==
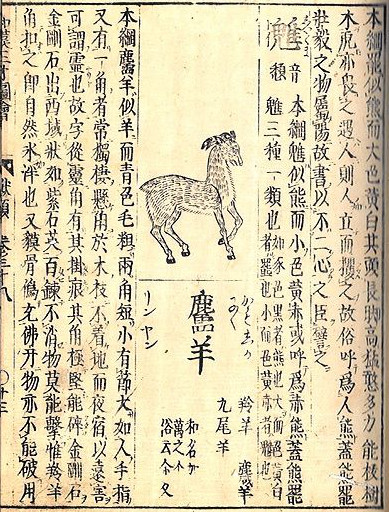
An entry on the serow in the 1712 encyclopaedia Wakan Sansai Zue

The earliest record of human contact with the serow is of a small number of prehistoric Jōmon period bones unearthed by archaeologists, primarily in mountainous regions. It is speculated the serow was hunted for its hide and for food. What is believed to be the earliest written record appears in the Nihon Shoki (720): the Emperor Tenmu (r. 672–686) sent the hides of a yamashishi to senior statesmen; this yamashishi likely refers to the serow, and recurs elsewhere in the Nihon Shoki.

The 8th-century Man'yōshū contains a waka poem by Kakinomoto no Hitomaro that mentions a group of shishi; a number of writers have concluded this animal is the serow, but others have pointed out the serow is normally solitary. Heian period (794–1185) documents record gifts of serow horns brought to the capital. Japan's earliest extant medical work, the Daidōruijuhō (808), appears to record the use of serow horn and flesh for medicinal purposes.

For centuries following the Heian period, mention of the serow becomes scarce. There is some belief that it was still hunted for medicinal use. The Edo period (1603–1868) saw records increase. The Wakan Sansai Zue encyclopaedia of 1712 contains an illustrated entry on the serow. Laws prohibiting hunting came into effect, but exceptions were made where animals damaged crops. Following the Meiji Restoration in 1868, realistic depictions appeared of the serow, beginning with one in Keisuke Ito's Fauna Japonica (1870).

=== Hunting and conservation ===
The serow has long been hunted in Japan, especially in northern Japan where, along with bear-hunting, serow-hunting was strongly associated with matagi culture. Throughout Japan's mountainous regions, the serow has been a valued catch. Its various body parts are used without waste. Prized in particular is its meat—until the mid-20th century, serow meat was so widely eaten in these regions the animal itself was known as "meat". (Note: "Meat" (Japanese: 肉, Hepburn: niku)) Its waterproof hides were used for rafters' backflaps, its horns were ground as a preventive against diseases such as beriberi, and a cure for stomach-aches was made from the serow's small intestines and gall bladder.

An animal that once inhabited deep forests far from populated areas, the Japanese serow has increasingly penetrated the outskirts of villages. In western Honshū, it had become extinct by the 20th century. Elsewhere, it had been hunted to such a severe degree that the Japanese government declared it a "Non-Game Species" in a 1925 hunting law. In 1934, the Law for Protection of Cultural Properties designated it a "Natural Monument Species". (Note: "Natural Monument" (Japanese: 天然記念物, Hepburn: ten'nen kinenbutsu))

Poaching continued, leading the government to declare the Japanese serow a "Special Natural Monument" in 1955, (Note: "Special Natural Monument" (Japanese: 特別天然記念物, Hepburn: tokubetsu ten'nen kinenbutsu)) at which point overhunting had brought its numbers to 2000–3000. Populations grew as the police put an end to poaching, and post-War monoculture conifer plantations created favourable environments for the animal. By the 1980s, population estimates had grown to up to 100,000 and serow range had reached 40,000 km^{2} (15,000 mi^{2}). Between 1978 and 2003, its distribution increased 170%, and the population had stabilized.

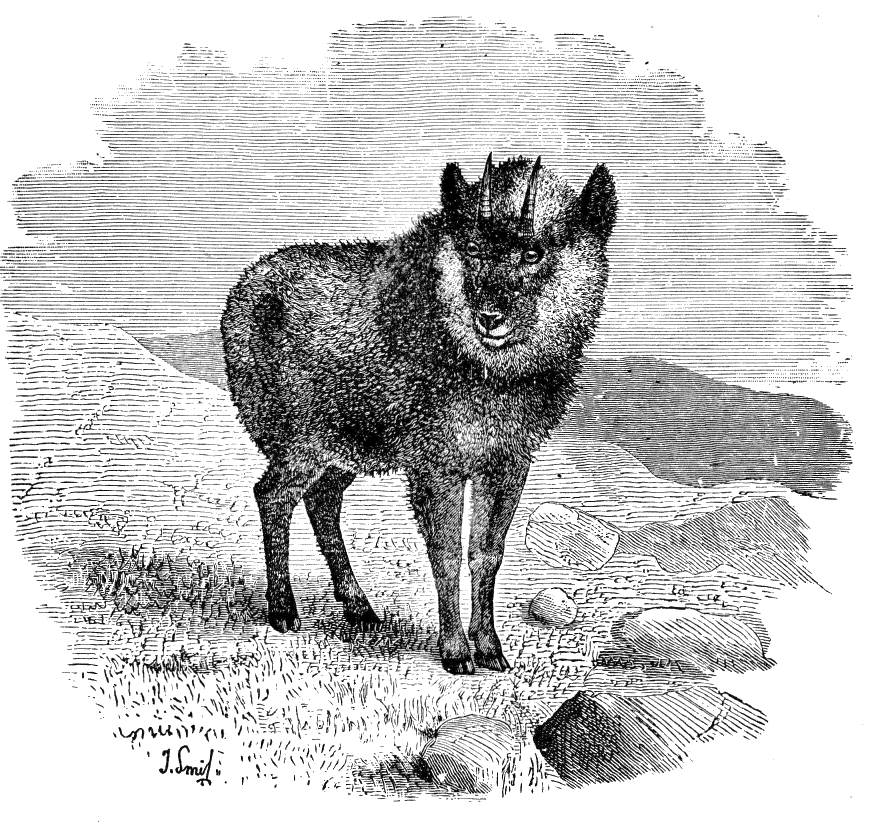
Capricornis crispus, or the Japanese serow (Frank Evers Beddard, 1902)

Conflicts with agriculture and forestry led to a 1978 repeal of the full protection the animal received under the 1955 designation. Thenceforth, 13 (Note: 15 such areas were originally proposed. Disputes with landowners have prevented their establishment in Kyushu and Shikoku.) designated protection areas were established over 23 prefectures. They cover about 20% of the serow range, have a total area of 11,800 km^{2} (4,600 mi^{2}), and range in size from 143 to 2,180 km^{2} (55 to 842 mi^{2}). Culling removed 20,000 serows outside of conservation areas between 1978 and 2005.

The IUCN Red List of Threatened Animals ranked the Japanese serow as "least concern" in 2008, as it has wide distribution in Japan, and a large, stable or increasing population. The Law for Protection of Cultural Properties (Note: Law for Protection of Cultural Properties (Japanese: 文化財保護法, Hepburn: bunkazai hogo-hō)) and Wildlife Protection and Hunting Law (Note: Wildlife Protection and Hunting Law (Japanese: 鳥獣の保護及び狩猟の適正化に関する法律, Hepburn: chōjū no hogo oyobi shuryō no tekiseika ni kansuru hōritsu)) provide for the legal management of the Japanese serow. In 1979, the Agency for Cultural Affairs, Environmental Agency, and Forestry Agency reached an agreement on serow management measures, such as the establishment of protection areas and culling as pest control. The measures were met with resistance from conservationists, naturalist organizations, and some biologists, as the animal had previously been fully protected. A 1999 amendment to the Wildlife Protection and Hunting Law allowed prefectures to manage wildlife populations; by 2007, seven plans had been established for serow management outside of conservation areas.

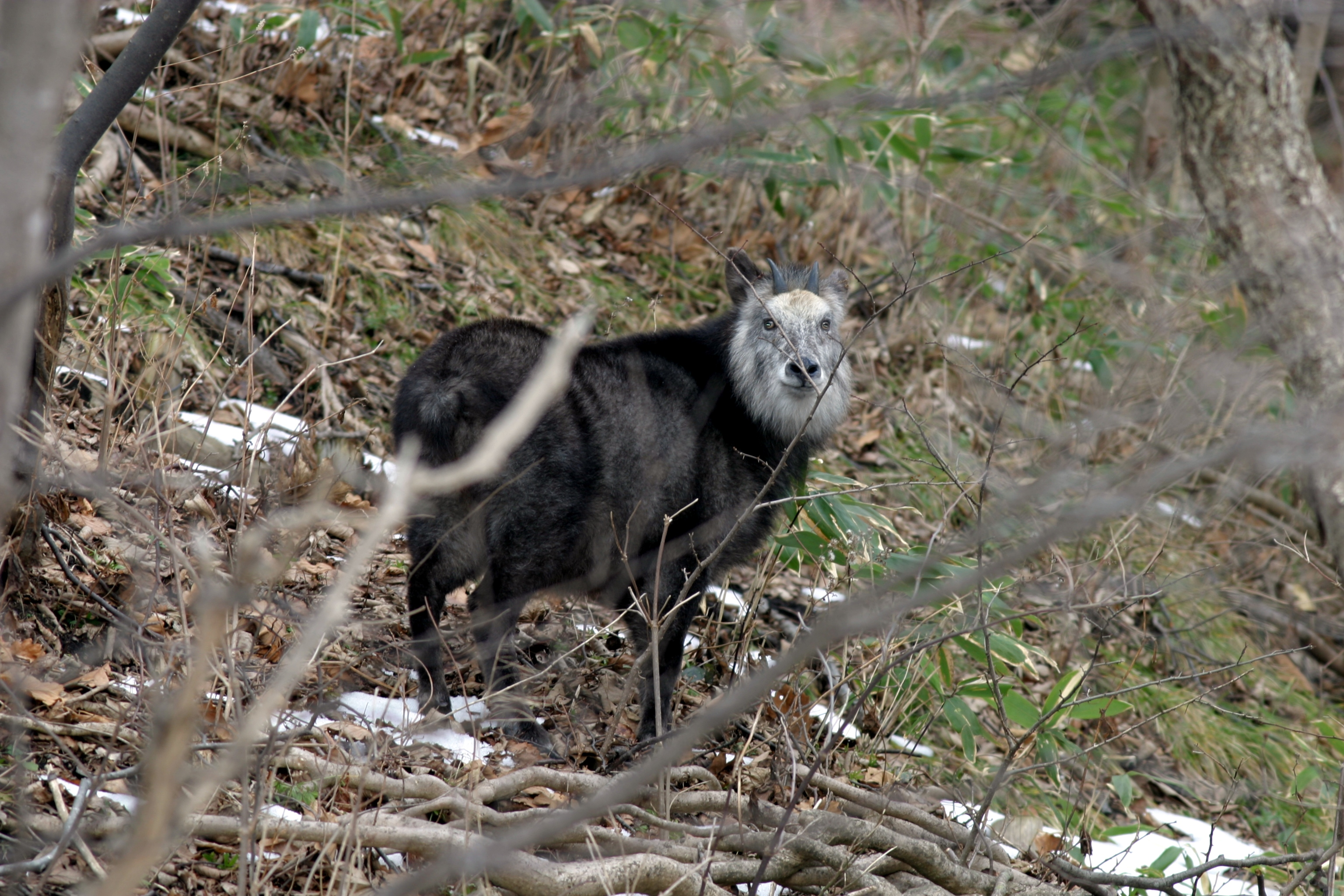
Foresters lament timber damage from the Japanese serow (photo in Wakinosawa, Aomori).

Foresters have raised concerns that the rising serow populations have interfered with post-War mountainside reforestation efforts, as the animal feeds on the saplings of Japanese cypress, Japanese cedar, and Japanese red pine, species with commercial significance. Serow have caused damage to farm crops in mountain villages, and the villagers have objected to conservationists' efforts. Damage by serows to forests has been characterized in parts of Japan in criminal or martial terms: the media have referred to the problems as ningen to shika no sensō ("the war between humans and deer") and kamoshika sensō ("serow war").

Frustration with the government and conservationists led 400 foresters to launch a lawsuit in the 1980s over serow damage to timber plantations. Foresters in Gifu Prefecture have justified the shooting of serows in the legs, as such shooting would not be fatal. Estimating accurate population numbers has been difficult. Foresters see the serow as a harmful animal, and resent government interference in controlling serow-hunting. They have accused the government and wildlife experts of undercounting serows, while conservationists have counteraccused that foresters may inflate population numbers and levels of forestry damage to promote their own interests.

Conservationists such as Shin Gotō believe that the increased visibility is due not to an absolute increase in populations, but to deforestation which has driven the animal further from its traditional home. Serows close to populated areas may feed on farms and cypress, including saplings.

Clearcutting practices may also contribute to the problem, as clearcut forests create areas of rapid herbaceous growth ideal for herbivores, who see population increases. The situation is temporary, though, and after regrowth of trees leads to the forest canopy closing over after 15–20 years, the herbivore populations are displaced as the herbaceous growth ceases to flourish.

In the 1990s, as the number of young plantations decreased, so did forestry damage from serows. Concern instead turned to damage caused by sika deer, wild boars, and Japanese macaques. In Kyushu in particular, increased grazing and browsing competition from sika deer may be slowing growth of serow populations.

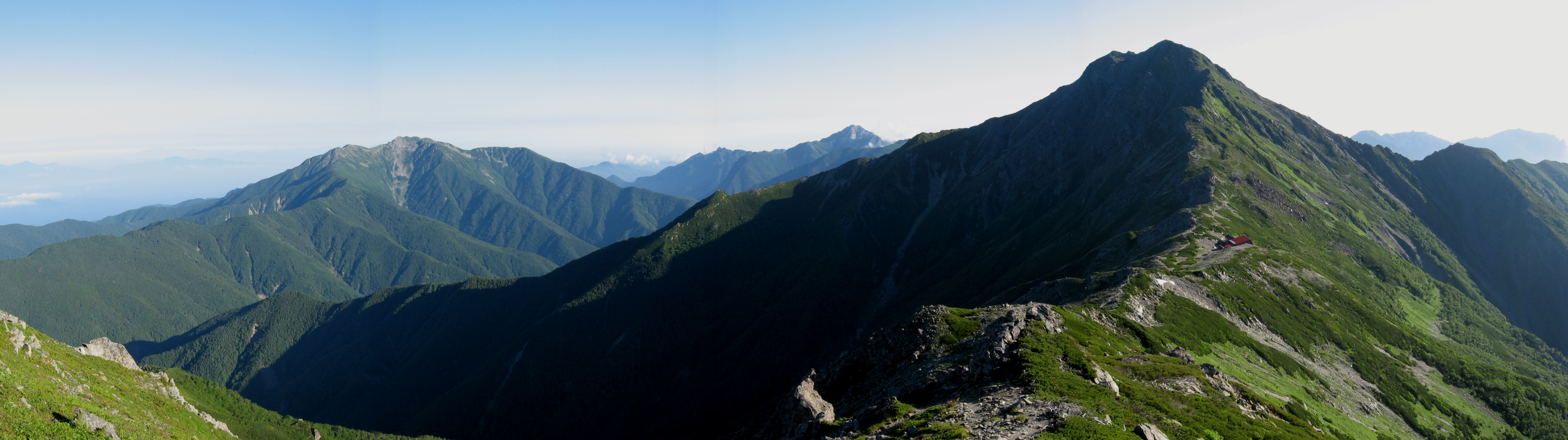
Conservation areas such as Minami Alps National Park provide a safe home for C. crispus.

=== Conservation areas ===
Japanese serow conservation areas
Name		Established	Size ha (acres)	Prefecture(s)
English	Japanese	Established	Size ha (acres)	Prefecture(s)
Shimokita Peninsula	Shimokita Hantō	April 1981	37,300 (92,000)	Aomori
Kita-Ōu Mountains	Kita-Ōu Sankei	February 1984	105,000 (260,000)	Aomori; Akita; Iwate
Kitakami Sankei	Kitakami Sankei	July 1982	41,000 (100,000)	Iwate
Minami-Ōu Mountains	Minami-Ōu Sankei	November 1984	57,700 (143,000)	Akita; Iwate; Yamagata; Miyagi
Asahi—Iide Mountains	Asahi—Iide Sankei	March 1985	122,000 (300,000)	Yamagata; Fukushima; Niigata
Echigo—Nikkō—Mikuni Mountains	Echigo—Nikkō—Mikuni Sankei	May 1984	215,200 (532,000)	Fukushima; Niigata; Tochigi; Gunma; Nagano
Kantō Mountains	Kantō Sanchi	November 1984	79,000 (200,000)	Gunma; Saitama; Tokyo; Yamanashi; Nagano
Minami Alps	Minami Arupusu	February 1980	122,000 (300,000)	Yamanashi; Nagano; Shizuoka
Kita Alps	Kita Arupusu	November 1979	195,600 (483,000)	Niigata; Nagano; Toyama; Gifu
Shirayama	Shirayama	February 1982	53,700 (133,000)	Toyama; Ishikawa; Gifu; Fukui
Suzuka Mountains	Suzuka Sanchi	September 1983	14,100 (35,000)	Shiga; Mie
Ibuki—Hira Mountains	Ibuki—Hira Sankei	March 1986	67,500 (167,000)	Gifu; Shiga; Fukui; Kyoto
Kii Mountains	Kii Sankei	July 1989	79,500 (196,000)	Mie; Nara; Wakayama
Shikoku Mountains	Shikoku Sanchi	TBA	TBA	Tokushima; Kōchi
Kyushu Mountains	Kyushu Sanchi	TBA	TBA	Ōita; Kumamoto; Miyazaki

=== Cultural significance ===
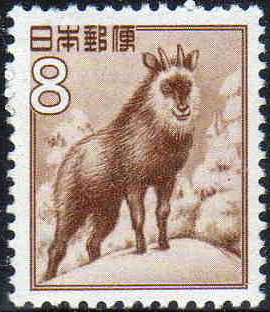
The Japanese serow featured on a 1952 ¥8 stamp

Labelled a "living national treasure of the forest", (Note: "living national treasure of the forest" (Japanese: 森の生きている国宝, Hepburn: mori no ikiteiru kokuhō)) the Japanese serow has achieved emblematic status in Japan with national associations. It is seen as a relic species harking back to the formation of the Japanese archipelago as distinct from mainland Asia. In a symbolic gesture in 1973, the Chinese government gifted Japan a giant panda, to which the Japanese government returned two Japanese serow. Municipalities and other regions of Japan have adopted the serow as a local symbol.

In Japan, the Japanese serow is most commonly known as kamoshika or kamoshishi. It has historically been given a variety of names, often based on its appearance, some of which translate as "mountain sheep", "wool deer", "nine tail cow", and "cow demon". Regional names abound, some of which translate as "dancing beast", "foolish beast", or "idiot". Japanese people often characterize the serow as "weird" or "abnormal", and it is seen as a "phantom animal" as it tends to live alone in the depths of distant forests, and appears to observe forest workers from areas high in the mountains.

The serow has a reputation in Japan for its speed and agility. Superior athletes are compared to the serow, as it is known not only for its agility, but also its sprinting ability. The Yamaha Motor Company has marketed the XT 225 sport motorcycle as the Yamaha Serow. In Japanese, the word ochiru means both "to fail an exam" and "to fall"; hence, as the serow is known for its sure-footedness on mountain cliffs, students can buy omamori charms marked with a serow hoofprint in the hope it will help them pass exams.

== See also ==
- List of Special Places of Scenic Beauty, Special Historic Sites and Special Natural Monuments
- History of the domestic sheep
