= Muellerius capillaris =

Scientific classification
- Kingdom: Animalia
- Phylum: Nematoda
- Class: Chromadorea
- Order: Rhabditida
- Family: Protostrongylidae
- Genus: Muellerius
- Species: M. capillaris

Binomial name
- Muellerius capillaris (Mueller, 1889)

Species of roundworm

Muellerius capillaris, also known as the hair or goat lungworm, is one of the most economically important nematodes of small ruminants. Although normally non-pathogenic in sheep, the parasite causes a disease condition called muelleriosis in goats. Sheep and goats commonly become infected after accidentally ingesting M. capillaris infected snails or slugs, and the parasite produces eggs in the lungs of its host, causing life-threatening bronchopneumonia in serious cases.

== Distribution ==
The distribution of M. capillaris is determined by the geographic location of the snail and slug intermediate hosts the parasite uses in its life cycle. The natural intermediate host of M. capillaris is a species of terrestrial snails belonging to the Genus Trochoidea, and juvenile T. seetzenii snails are the most susceptible to the parasitic infection. These snails were first isolated and characterized in the Negev Desert in Israel. However, many other genus of snails can be infected by M. capillaris: Helix, Helicells, Theba, Abida, and Zebrina. Several genus of slugs such as Limax and Agriolimax can also serve as the intermediate host. Since there are many intermediate hosts, M. capillaris is found worldwide. In areas of temperate climates, nearly all sheep are infected.

== Life cycle ==
This parasite utilizes two hosts to complete its life cycle. First, the parasite infects a snail or slug intermediate host. The snail or slug is subsequently ingested by a sheep or goat while grazing. The larvae migrate to the lungs by the lymphatic system and cross into the alveoli or bronchioles. In the alveoli, the larvae mature to the adult stage, and the adults lay their eggs in the lung tissue. The eggs rapidly hatch, and the larvae are coughed up or swallowed. The larvae are expelled into the environment in the sputum or feces. The larvae reinfect a snail or slug to complete the life cycle.

== Zoonotic potential ==
M. capillaris is not transmissible to humans.

== Clinical signs ==
M. capillaris is less pathogenic in sheep, because it normally only affects the subpleural space resulting in less pathology. However, goats may present with coughing, pneumonia, weight loss, reduced weight gains, and lethargy. More serious infections seldom occur, because ruminants must ingest a large amount of snails or slugs for severe infections to occur, but serious infections result in bronchopneumonia and eventually death of the animal. 2 centimeter nodular lesions in the lungs will also be visible upon a necropsy; the nodules may be filled with white pus. Postmortem examination may also reveal small, white, and threadlike worms less than 3 cm in length in the lung tissue.

== Diagnosis ==
Postmortem examination may also reveal small, white, and threadlike worms less than 3 cm in length in the lung tissue. Postmortem examination will also reveal nodular lesions 2 centimeters in length in the lungs; the nodules may be filled with white pus.

Stage one larva (L1) can be detected in fecal samples by the Baermann-Wetzel technique.

== Treatment and prevention ==
Treatment of sheep is normally unnecessary, because they are not usually affected by the infection. Ivermectin and benzimidazole can be used to kill the adult worms in goats. Daily doses of fenbendazole or albendazole for 1-2 weeks will destroy all life stages in goats.

Prevention and control of M. capillaris is difficult, because the snail and slug intermediate hosts are virtually everywhere, and the parasite can survive in the intermediate host for years. However, effective pasture drainage and use of chemicals may reduce snail and slug populations.
