= Moose sickness =

Neurological disease of moose

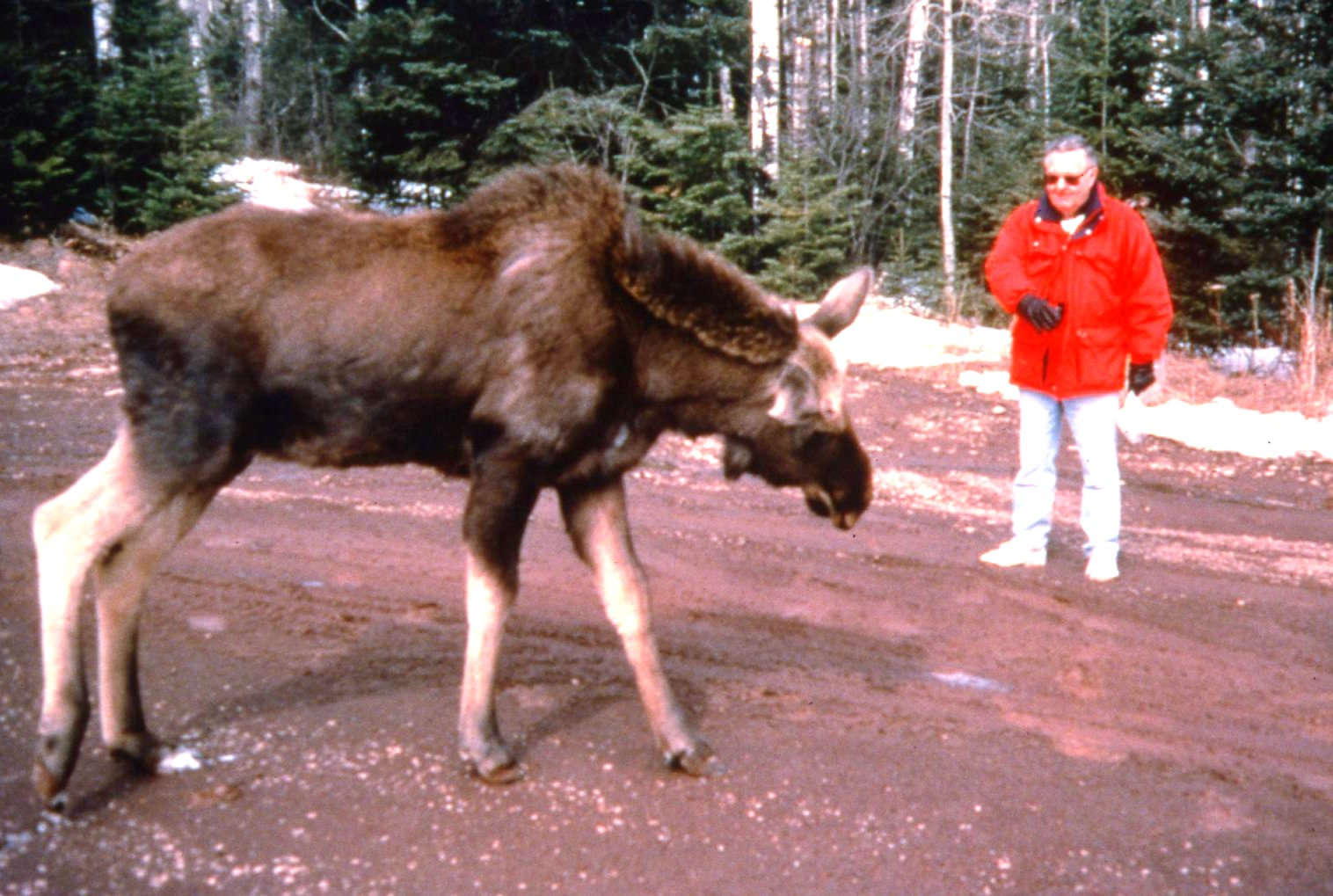
Photo by Wm. Peterson

Moose sickness (also called moose disease, moose circling disease) is a neurological condition seen in the northern mixed-wood forests of central and eastern North America where moose distribution overlaps with that of white-tailed deer. The disease is characterized by an unsteady gait, stumbling, head held to one side, circling, staying in one location, and in severe cases, being unable to get up.

The cause of the disease was discovered by Prof. Roy Anderson, University of Guelph, to be the meningeal worm, Parelaphostrongylus tenuis, of white-tailed deer, a host that is unaffected by this nematode parasite. The worm's life cycle is complex. To get the disease, a moose must eat the parasite's intermediate host, terrestrial snails or slugs, that have contacted deer feces containing larvae. Moose ingest these accidentally along with ground or low vegetation.

The severity of the disease in individual animals depends on dose, age at infection, and previous experience with the parasite. Younger animals are thought to be most susceptible. Experimentally, neurologic signs exhibited by moose given fewer than 5 infective larvae can resolve, and previously infected animals may have some resistance to subsequent exposure.

The impact of the disease on moose at the population level has been difficult to evaluate. Reports of acutely sick animals are sporadic and the likelihood of the disease being responsible for historical moose declines in particular regions of eastern North America has been debated. Several alternative hypotheses attempt to explain moose declines. Recent evidence supports the view that the disease can, in concert with other bio-climatic factors, play a major role in marked and prolonged declines in moose numbers. Such declines occur when densities of sympatric, infected deer remain in excess of 5/km^{2} for extended periods (10 to 15 yrs) and climatic conditions promoting terrestrial gastropod survival and mobility prevail.
