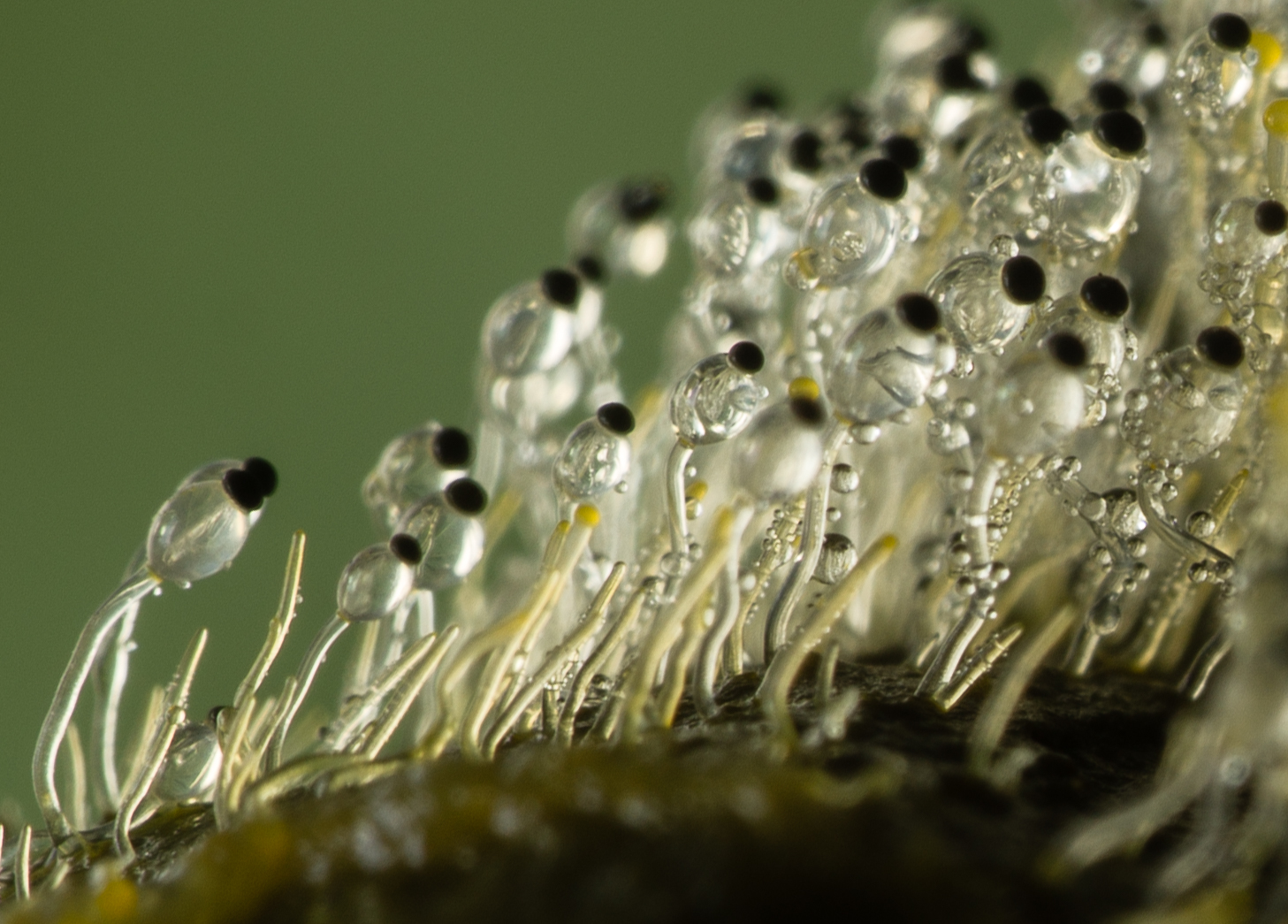
- Pilobolus crystallinus sporangia

Scientific classification
- Kingdom: Fungi
- Division: Mucoromycota
- Class: Mucoromycetes
- Order: Mucorales
- Family: Pilobolaceae
- Genus: Pilobolus
- Species: P. crystallinus

Binomial name
- Pilobolus crystallinus (F.H.Wigg.) Tode (1784)

= Pilobolus crystallinus =

Species of fungus

Pilobolus crystallinus, commonly known as the "dung cannon" or "hat thrower", is a species of fungus belonging to the Mucorales order. It is unique in that it adheres its spores to vegetation, so as to be eaten by grazing animals. It then passes through the animals' digestive systems and grows in their feces. Although these fungi only grow to be 2–4 cm (0.8–1.6 in) tall, they can shoot their sporangium, containing their spores, up to 2 m (6.6 ft) away. Due to an increase of pressure in the vesicle, the sporangium can accelerate 0–45 mph in the first millimeter of its flight, which corresponds to an acceleration of 20000 g. Using a mucus-like substance found in the vesicle of the fungus, the sporangium can adhere itself onto whatever it lands, thus completing its life cycle.

The basionym of this species is Hydrogera crystallina F.H. Wigg. 1780.

The ability of this fungus to cause problems for florists was noted in the scientific literature in 1881:

... this small fungus had proved this season to be an expensive annoyance to florists engaged in winter forcing flowers. Rose-growers especially had found it to interfere seriously with their profits. The injury was caused by the projection of the sporangia which covered the flowers and leaves of the roses as if profusely dusted with black pepper. The flowers were almost unsaleable as the first impression was that the black dots were aphids.

== Description ==
This fungus normally grows beneath the surface – a sensitivity to oxygen inhibits radial growth at the hyphae. According to McVickar (1942), and later amended by Ootaki et al. (1993), the development of P. crystallinus may be divided into six stages: In stage I, the sporangiophore initially elongates at the apex, but does not rotate. In stage II, the sporangiophore develops a sporangium. In stage III, after the development of the sporangium, there is a temporary cessation of growth. In stage IV, a subsporangial vesicle expands beneath the sporangium. This is followed by stage V, where the spore matures, and the region of hypha directly below the subsporangial vesicle continues elongating. Finally, in stage VI, the subsporangial vesicle bursts and throws the sporangium into the air. Scanning and transmission electron microscopy has shown that the surface of the sporangium is covered with crystals of two distinct sizes. The larger crystals enclose spines having a central pore.

== Host species ==
Pilobolus crystallinus has been reported to grow on the dung of cattle.
