= Muellerius tenuispiculatus =

Scientific classification
- Kingdom: Animalia
- Phylum: Nematoda
- Class: Chromadorea
- Order: Rhabditida
- Family: Protostrongylidae
- Genus: Muellerius
- Species: M. tenuispiculatus

Binomial name
- Muellerius tenuispiculatus Gebauer, 1932

Species of lungworm

Muellerius tenuispiculatus is a species of small lungworm (a protostrongylid nematode) that infects wild ruminants, particularly chamois (Rupicapra rupicapra), causing parasitic infections in their lungs, with larvae often found in faeces and snails serving as intermediate hosts. This parasite's lifecycle involves snails, and it is a significant component of lungworm infections in chamois populations across Europe, including the Low Tatra National Park and the Alps.
