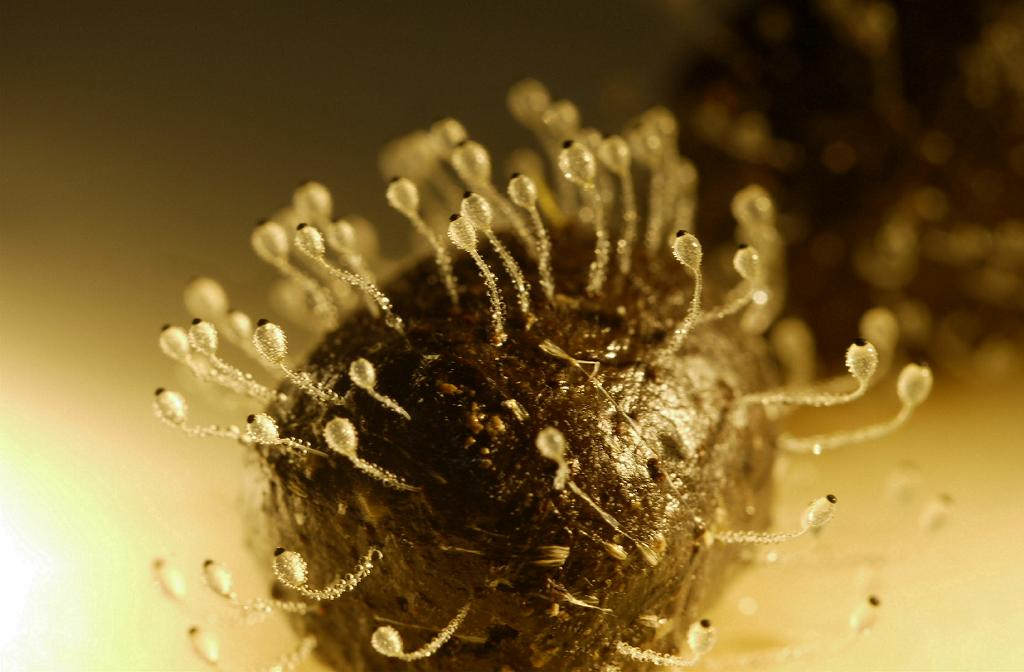
- Pilobolus crystallinus

Scientific classification
- Kingdom: Fungi
- Division: Mucoromycota
- Class: Mucoromycetes
- Order: Mucorales
- Family: Pilobolaceae; Corda

Type genus
- Pilobolus Tode

Genera
- Pilobolus; Utharomyces

= Pilobolaceae =

Family of fungi

The Pilobolaceae are a family of fungi in the Mucorales order. Generally, species in this family have a widespread distribution, although there are some that are restricted to tropical and subtropical regions. This family includes two genera: Pilobolus, and Utharomyces.

== Morphology ==
All species produce unusual, phototrophic sporangiophores. These sporangiophores give rise to dark-colored, columellate sporagia covered in calcium oxalate crystals. In Pilobolus and Utharomyces, inflated structures filled with yellow carotenoid pigments give rise to the sporophores; these two genera also produce subsporangiul vesicles. Zygospores are formed on apposed, entwined suspensors, usually at or below the dung.

== Ecology ==
All species grow on dung but can rarely be isolated from the soil. Pilobolus are common on many types of herbivore dung, while Utharomyces grows on rodent dung. Utharomyces appears to be restricted to the tropics.

== Dispersal ==
This family has spectacular means of dispersal. Many species require passage through the gut of an herbivore in order for the spores to germinate. The problem is that many animals tend to avoid eating their own dung. To compensate, remarkable mechanisms of spore dispersal are used.

In Pilobolus, the subsporangial swelling acts as a lens to focus light on light-sensitive pigments at the base of the swelling. Turgor pressure builds inside of the swelling until it ruptures, and the sporangium is hurled for 2 meters. The calcium oxalate crystals helps it adhere to the surface it lands on, and if the surface is wet, the crystals allow the sporangium to rotate. This rotation allows the mucus surrounding the spores (under the crystals) to glue it to surface where it will await ingestion by an herbivore. Nematodes have been observed climbing the sporangiophore or swimming inside of it to catch a ride on the sporangium. While many species may do this, it seems only Dictyocaulus vivipores, cattle lungworm, are able to survive the trip.

Mechanisms of dispersal are less known in these genera. In both genera, the sporangiophore, guided by light, elongates until the sporangium is brought into contact with a solid surface. In Pilobolus, contact with the surface causes a rupture at the columella, which releases the sporangium, which adheres to the new surface. In Utharomyces, contact with the surface ruptures the subsporangial swelling. This releases cytoplasm, which is used to glue the upper portion of the swelling containing the sporangium to the substrate.
