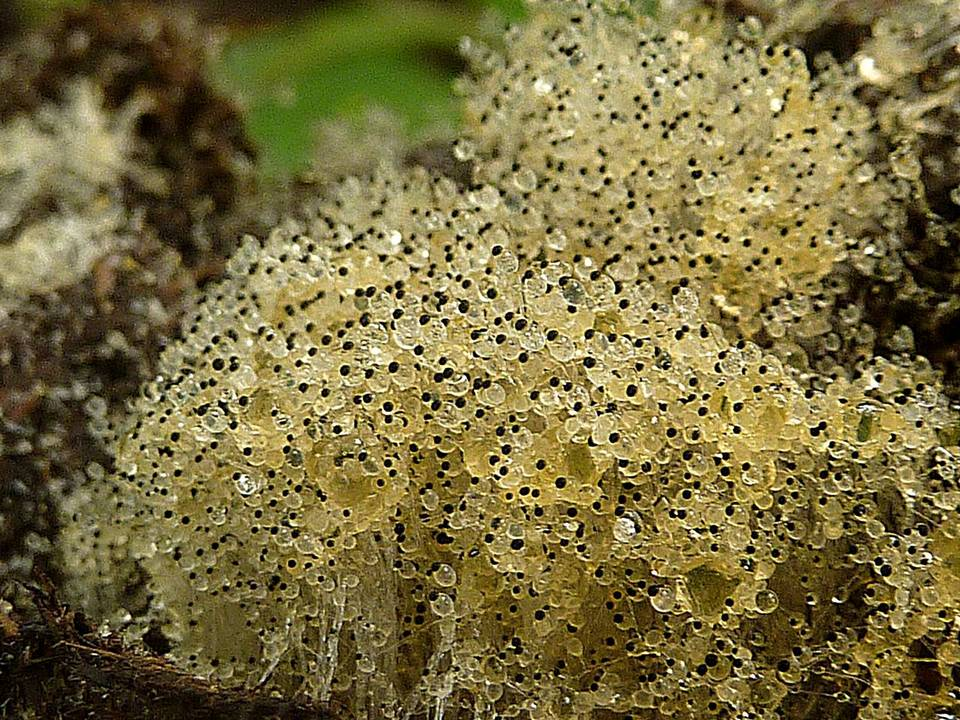
- Pilobolus sp.

Scientific classification
- Kingdom: Fungi
- Division: Mucoromycota
- Class: Mucoromycetes
- Order: Mucorales
- Family: Pilobolaceae
- Genus: Pilobolus; Tode (1784)

Type species
- Pilobolus crystallinus L.Klein

Species
- P. crystallinus P. kleinii P. longipes P. sphaerosporus P. umbonatus P. roridus

Synonyms
- Hydrogera F.H. Wigg. ex Kuntze; Pycnopodium Corda; Hydrogera F.H. Wigg.

= Pilobolus =

Genus of fungi

Pilobolus is a genus of fungi that commonly grows on herbivore dung.

== Life cycle ==
The life cycle of Pilobolus begins with a black sporangium that has been discharged onto a plant substrate such as grass. A herbivorous animal such as a horse then eats the substrate, unknowingly consuming the sporangium as well. The Pilobolus sporangium survives the passage through the gastrointestinal tract without germinating, and emerges with the excrement. Once outside its host, spores within the sporangium germinate and grow as a mycelium within the excrement, where it is a primary colonizer. Later, the fungus fruits to produce more spores.

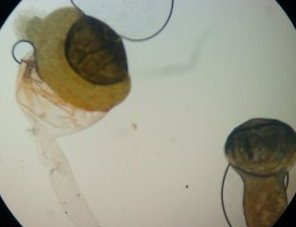
Pilobolus sporangium

The asexual fruiting structure (the sporangiophore) of Pilobolus species is unique. It consists of a transparent stalk which rises above the excrement to end in a balloon-like subsporangial vesicle. On top of this, a single, black sporangium develops. The sporangiophore has the remarkable ability of orienting itself to point directly towards a light source. The shape and transparency of the subsporangial vesicle allow it to act as a lens, focusing light into carotenoid pigments deposited near the base of the vesicle, which absorb the photons and allow cells to detect the light level in the direction of the lens. The developing sporangiophore grows such that the maturing sporangium is aimed directly at the light.

When turgor pressure within the subsporangial vesicle builds to a sufficient level (often 7 ATM or greater), the sporangium is launched, and can travel anywhere from a couple of centimeters to a distance of 3 meters (10ft). For a sporangiophore less than 1cm tall, this involves acceleration from 0 to 20 km/h in only 2 μs, subjecting it to over 20,000 G, equivalent to a human being launched at 100 times the speed of sound. The orientation of the stalk towards the early morning sun apparently guarantees that the sporangium is shot some distance from the excrement, enhancing the chances that it will attach to vegetation and be eaten by a new host.

Another adaptation of Pilobolus is that the sporangium is covered in calcium oxalate crystals. Besides serving as a protective mechanism, their hydrophobic nature also leads the sporangium to flip over onto its sticky bottom after landing in a drop of dew, thus allowing it to cling to a plant substrate. Pilobolus species can be grown in artificial culture, but only when the growth medium is supplemented with some form of chelated iron, or with sterilized herbivore dung.

The forcible discharge mechanism of Pilobolus is exploited by parasitic nematodes including lungworms in the genus Dictyocaulus. Larval lungworm nematodes excreted by infected deer, elk, cattle, horses, and other hosts climb up Pilobolus sporangiophores and are discharged with the sporangium. They complete their life cycle when they and their Pilobolus vector are eaten by a new host.
