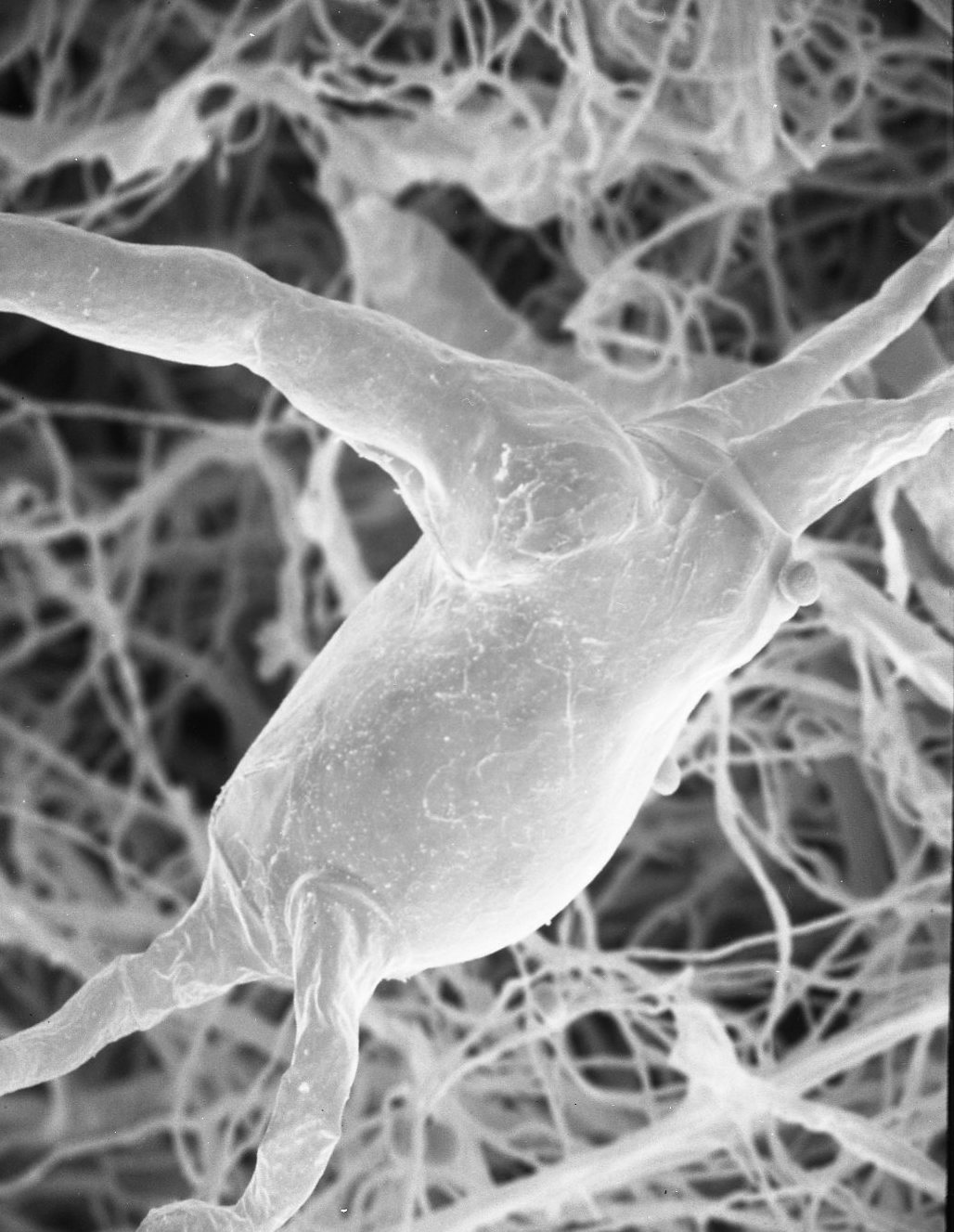

Scientific classification
- Domain: Eukaryota
- Kingdom: Fungi
- Division: Mucoromycota
- Class: Mucoromycetes
- Order: Mucorales
- Family: Pilobolaceae
- Genus: Utharomyces; Boedijn (1958)

Type species
- Utharomyces epallocaulus Boedijn ex P.M.Kirk & Benny (1980)

= Utharomyces =

Single-species genus of fungi

Utharomyces is a fungal genus in the family Pilobolaceae. The genus is monotypic, containing the single coprophilous (dung-loving) species Utharomyces epallocaulus, which is widely distributed in subtropical regions. Utharomyces was circumscribed by the Dutch botanist Karel Bernard Boedijn in 1958. U. epallocaulus has been collected in Bahamas, Ghana, India, Indonesia, Mexico, China, and the United States.
