= Parelaphostrongylus =

Scientific classification
- Kingdom: Animalia
- Phylum: Nematoda
- Class: Chromadorea
- Order: Rhabditida
- Family: Protostrongylidae
- Genus: Parelaphostrongylus; Boev & Schultz, 1950

Genus of nematodes

Parelaphostrongylus is a genus of parasitic nematodes belonging to the family Protostrongylidae. All species in this genus use North American cervids as definitive hosts.

== Species ==
Three species are assigned to this genus:

- Parelaphostrongylus andersoni Prestwood, 1972
- Parelaphostrongylus odocoilei (Hobmaier and Hobmaier, 1934)
- Parelaphostrongylus tenuis (Dougherty, 1945)

== Life cycle ==
Infected cervids pass first-stage larvae in their fecal pellets. After coming into contact with the larvae, gastropods become intermediate hosts and facilitate development of the larvae to the infective third stage. Transmission to the definitive hosts occurs when cervids inadvertently consume infected gastropods along with food. Infective larvae of Parelaphostrongylus odocoilei have been shown to emerge from gastropod hosts in lab conditions, raising the possibility of an alternate transmission route.
