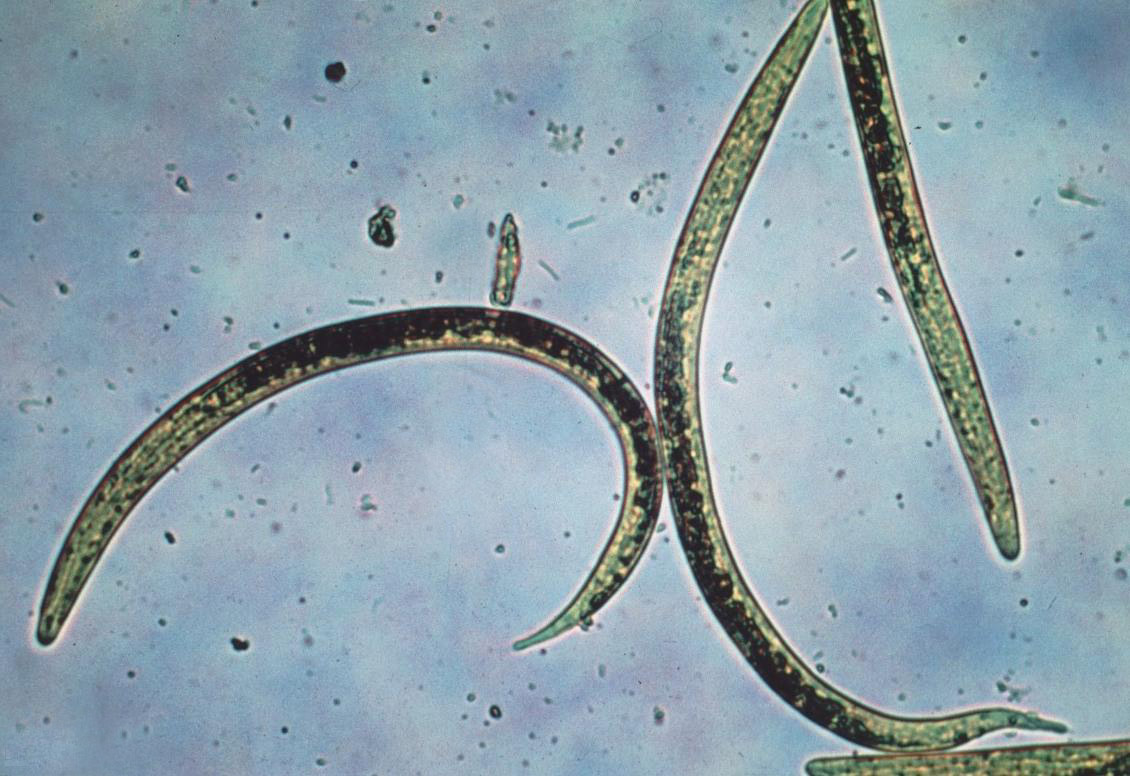

Scientific classification
- Kingdom: Animalia
- Phylum: Nematoda
- Class: Chromadorea
- Order: Rhabditida
- Superfamily: Trichostrongyloidea
- Family: Dictyocaulidae

= Dictyocaulidae =

Family of roundworms

Dictyocaulidae is a family of nematodes belonging to the order Rhabditida.

Genera:

- Borrellostrongylus Gutiérrez, 1945
- Bronchonema Mönnig, 1932
- Cardiostrongylus Sakamoto & Malgor, 1995
- Dictyocaulus Railliet & Henry, 1907
- Mertensinema Sharpilo, 1976
