= Parelaphostrongylus tenuis =

Scientific classification
- Kingdom: Animalia
- Phylum: Nematoda
- Class: Chromadorea
- Order: Rhabditida
- Family: Protostrongylidae
- Genus: Parelaphostrongylus
- Species: P. tenuis

Binomial name
- Parelaphostrongylus tenuis Dougherty, 1945

Species of roundworm

Parelaphostrongylus tenuis (also known as meningeal worm or brainworm) is a neurotropic nematode parasite common to white-tailed deer, Odocoileus virginianus, which causes damage to the central nervous system. Moose (Alces alces), elk (Cervus canadensis), caribou (Rangifer tarandus), mule deer (Odocoileus hemionus), and others are also susceptible to the parasite, but are aberrant hosts and are infected in neurological instead of meningeal tissue. The frequency of infection in these species increases dramatically when their ranges overlap with high densities of white-tailed deer.

The lifecycle begins in infected meningeal tissues in the central nervous system (CNS) where adult brainworms lay eggs. The eggs are dislodged from the CNS and pass into the lungs, where they hatch. The larvae are then coughed up, swallowed, and proceed through the gastrointestinal tract. Snails and slugs then serve as intermediate hosts, which are later eaten by ungulates, allowing the process to continue. Changes in climate and habitat beginning in the early 1900s have expanded range overlap between white-tailed deer and moose, increasing the frequency of infection within the moose population.

== Lifecycle ==
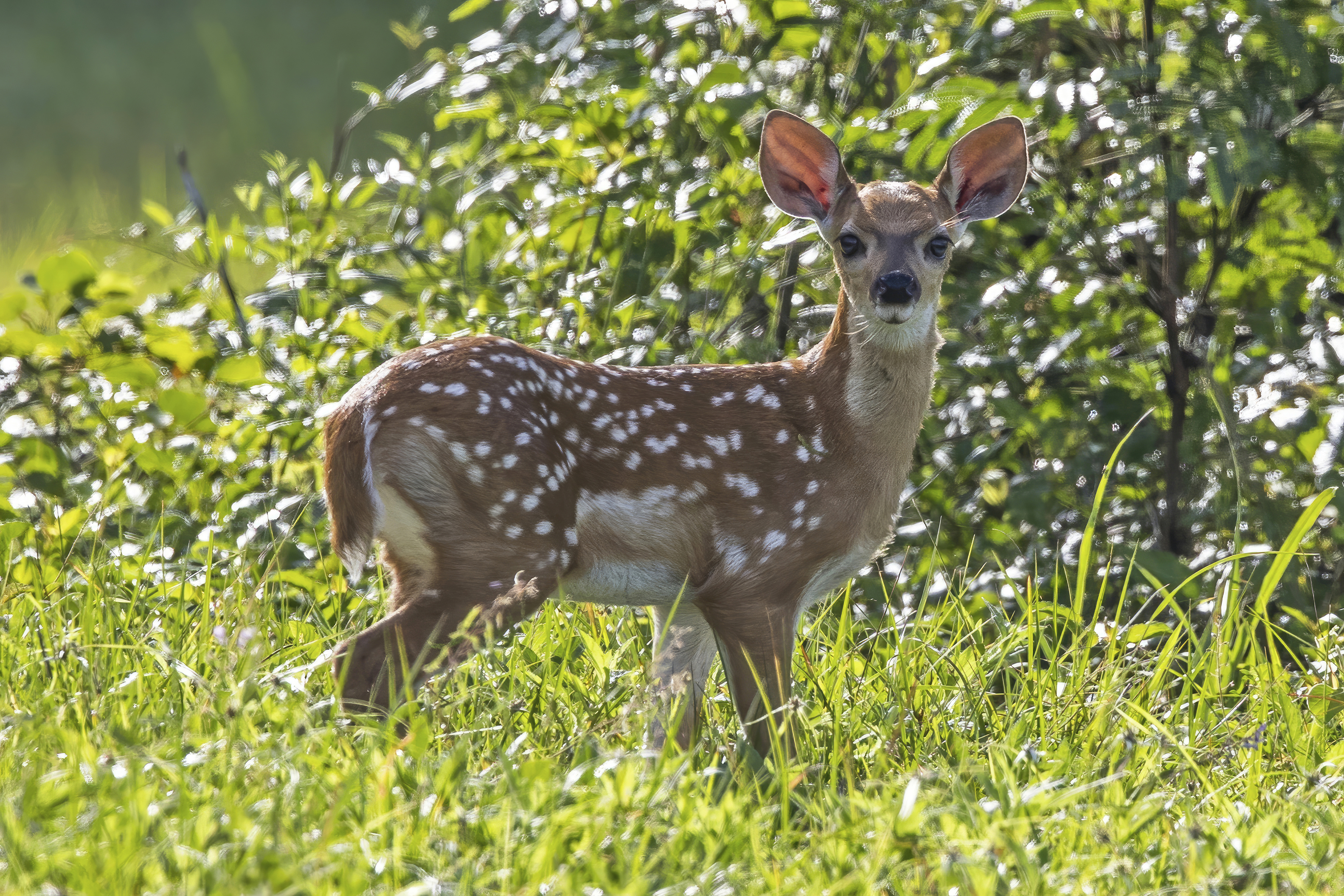
White-tailed deer are a common host of P. tenuis.

The lifecycle of P. tenuis is complex and multistaged.

Adults lay eggs on the dura mater (the outer layer of the meninges) of the brain or directly into the bloodstream of an infected host. The eggs hatch into first-stage larvae, which travel in the bloodstream to the lungs, where they travel up the respiratory tract, are swallowed, and then pass out of the body in the mucus coating of fecal pellets.

Gastropods such as snails and slugs feed upon the mucus coating of the fecal pellets and ingest the larvae. While in the gastropod, the larvae develop into second- and third-stage larvae, which are capable of infection.

Gastropods carrying second- and third-stage larvae may be accidentally ingested with plants, which results in the larvae being transmitted to a new host. The larvae then move into the new host's stomach wall and make their way to the CNS in white-tailed deer and other ungulates. Once in these tissues, they develop into their adult third stage of life and lay eggs to begin the cycle again.

== Transmission ==
Adults of P. tenuis can persist for many years in a single host, which allows for many first-stage larvae to be shed in feces. It is quite common in many populations of white-tailed deer, which have built up a strong resistance. After gastropod ingestion, moose or other deer may be hosts of the second- and third-stage worms. Moose resistance to P. tenuis is much lower than white-tailed deer, which results in a higher mortality rate.

Infected deer density, temperature, climate conditions, and length of transmission periods all affect transmission levels.

- Areas with higher deer populations experience dramatic increases in incidental brainworm larvae consumption.
- The temperature and climate conditions of summers can regulate gastropod abundance, with hot, dry summers reducing populations and cool, dry summers increasing populations.
- High or low gastropod populations directly affect the transmission rate of larval worms to new hosts. Hot, dry summers also reduce the survival numbers of first-stage larvae on fecal pellets.
- Variation of transmission periods is based on the time when snow is absent from the ground. Gastropods are dormant during snow periods, thus first-stage worms cannot be transmitted to additional hosts. So, shorter seasons of snow are met with longer transmission periods of increased potential for transmission through the intermediate vector gastropods.

Survival of P. tenuis could be increased due to the higher temperatures and milder winters caused by climate change. Moose are already facing heat stress due to climate change, and may have increased susceptibility to parasitic and infectious diseases like the brain worm.

== Symptoms/clinical signs ==
Brainworm affects neurological and behavioral responses. Deer rarely show any external symptoms of P. tenuis infection due to their high acquired resistance. Moose, however, have low resistance, and may show a number of symptoms. Though infrequent, cases of moose recovering from brainworm infection have been reported. In both deer and moose, symptom severity does not necessarily vary with severity of infection.

- Infected individuals may not have any external symptoms.
- Mild symptoms may include slower movements and response time, frequent stumbling, unusually tilted head, and emaciation.
- Severe symptoms include extreme weakness, lameness, walking in circles, partial or whole blindness, loss of fear for humans, ataxia, and mortality.

Several other ungulates are susceptible to brainworm infection, including elk, caribou, mule deer, sheep, goats, llamas, and alpacas. Rarely, it has been seen in cattle and horses as well. Severe neurological damage similar to that of infected moose is shown to occur in these species. It has been shown through experimental infection that Parelaphostrongylus tenuis can produce severe Meningoencephalomyelitis and paralysis of llamas in two months after infection and with the ingestion of as few as six larvae.

== Diagnosis ==
Presently, a commercial antibody test that can detect P. tenuis antemortem does not exist. Diagnosis in deer can be conducted by analyzing fecal pellets for larval P. tenuis, or post mortem necropsy to detect presence of adult P. tenuis in the brain cavity or second- and third-stage worms along the spinal cord. However, brainworm larvae are difficult to distinguish from other parasitic worm species that can also be found in fecal pellets, so detection of adult worms through necropsy is recommended. Diagnosis in moose is conducted with necropsy to detect worms in the brain or spinal cord. Diagnosis in horses can be conducted with postmortem samples used for polymerase chain reaction (PCR) testing. Positive PCR results show evidence of P. tenuis infecting equines. In veterinary patients, such as goats, an eosinophilic pleocytosis can be suggestive of P. tenuis infection.

== History ==
In 1912, an unknown neurological disease affecting moose was first reported in Minnesota. Major declines in the moose population were reported, 1925–27 and 1933–34, following the discovery of this unknown disease. In 1963, a meningeal brainworm, Pneumostrongylus tenuis, was determined as the etiological agent causing neurological disease in moose. Around 1971, taxonomists reclassified it as Parelaphostrongylus tenuis.

White-tailed deer populations in the eastern United States are now known to be commonly infected with meningeal worm. Infection in the southeastern and western United States is less common. This disease has also been found in the Canadian provinces of Ontario, Saskatchewan, Manitoba, and Nova Scotia. The grassland biomes of the United States and Canada apparently act as a barrier to the movement of the disease. Evidence from Canada seems to support this, since the western distribution of meningeal worm has changed little since the 1960s.

== Epidemiology ==
The geographic ranges of moose and white-tailed deer were historically separate prior to the 20th century. Moose are well adapted to winter survival, whereas deer are not. They could not withstand the harsh winters in these regions of the northeastern United States and the southeastern provinces of Canada. Deer populations began to move into the southern portions of moose range in the early 1900s following changes in climate, logging, mining, forest fires, and increasing human development. High-quality deer habitat associated with these changes has led to dramatic increases in deer abundance in these regions.

White-tailed deer are the normal host of the P. tenuis parasite and are immunologically adapted to its presence. Deer and P. tenuis have coadapted in an evolutionary arms race over time. Deer remain largely unaffected by the presence of P. tenuis because of the immunity they have built as a result of coadaptation. The prevalence and infection rate of P. tenuis in deer is density dependent; increased rates of infection by the parasite are the result of higher deer densities.

Moose populations on the southern fringes of their range have recently experienced dramatic declines. As deer encroached upon the southern fringes of moose range, they introduced the parasite to a naïve host, the moose. Upon transmission of the pathogen into moose, the worm causes cerebrospinal nematodiasis, a disease of the nervous system that often results in death. P. tenuis may be one factor that has contributed to moose declines in southern portions of their range. This disruption of host-pathogen dynamics due to habitat alterations has promoted the spread of this parasite to a naïve host and has potentially contributed to declines in moose abundance and productivity in regions with high deer densities. Continued increase in deer abundance and density in the southern fringes of moose range are predicted to facilitate sustained transmission of P. tenuis to moose. Continued transmission of deer-related parasites, coupled with low productivity, habitat degradation, and a northward shift in the moose thermoneutral zone, leads to a troubling prognosis for southern moose populations. Murray et al. (2006) predict, if current trends continue, moose populations in these regions will not be viable and population declines will persist.

== Treatment ==
Currently, there is no definitive treatment for P. tenuis in mammals, though research is still being conducted. The use of anthelmintics (ivermectin and fenbendazole) have been attempted in white-tailed deer. The results indicate, however, that ivermectin was ineffective against larvae that had already reached the spinal cord. Fenbendazole and ivermectin, combined with anti-inflammatory therapy have been used to manage infections in goats.

== Current and past research ==
The majority of moose brainworm research in North America has been conducted in northern Minnesota, where a historical moose population of 4,000 to 5,000 moose had declined to an estimated 1,200 individuals by 1997. In this region, wildlife managers are challenged to predict and attempt to mitigate moose declines resulting from deer-related pathogens. Because no effective methods to prevent the transmission or infection of brainworm in moose have been found, managers have focused their efforts on decreasing deer densities in these regions. Managers in these areas are responsible for evaluating suitable habitat for moose and deer, as well as setting management priorities and population goals to decrease the transmission of Parelaphostrongylus tenuis in moose. Though the main focus of research has been on white-tailed deer and moose, research has found that the guinea pig can be used as an experimental model of P. tenuis infection.
