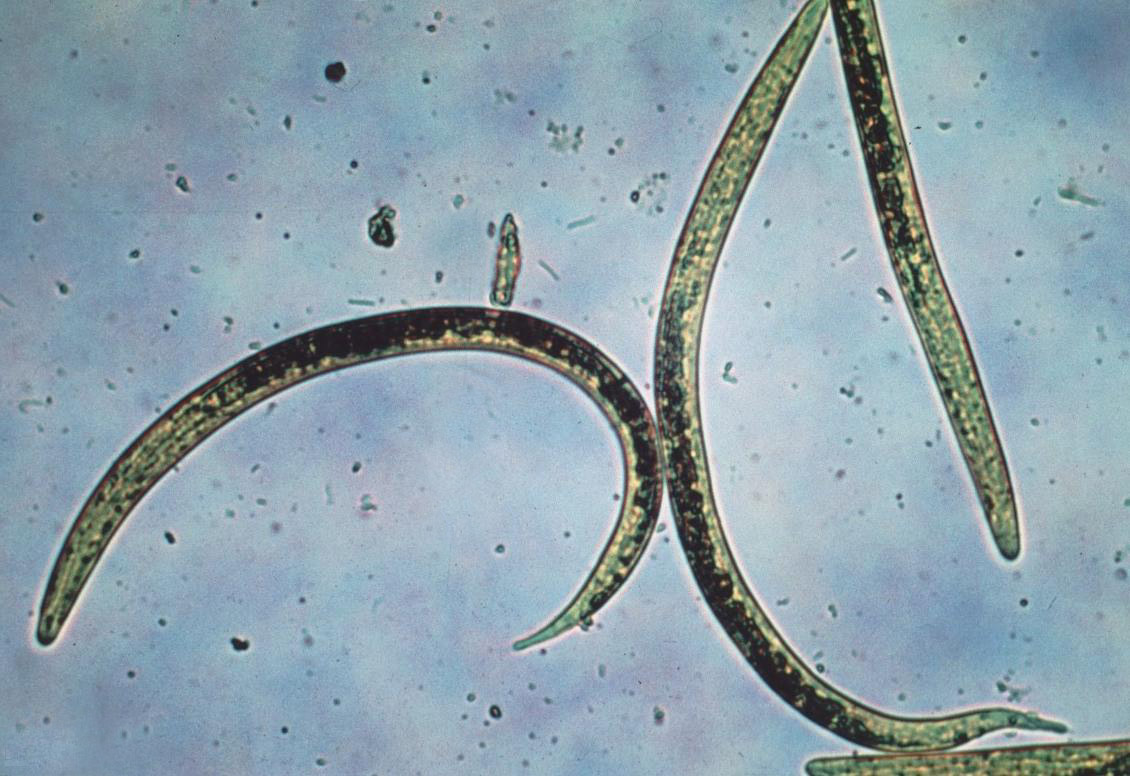

Scientific classification
- Kingdom: Animalia
- Phylum: Nematoda
- Class: Chromadorea
- Order: Rhabditida
- Family: Dictyocaulidae
- Genus: Dictyocaulus
- Species: D. viviparus

Binomial name
- Dictyocaulus viviparus (Bloch, 1782)

= Dictyocaulus viviparus =

Species of nematode

Dictyocaulus viviparus is a species of nematodes belonging to the family Dictyocaulidae.

The species has cosmopolitan distribution. It is parasitic, and has the common name of the bovine lungworm due to its negative impact on cattle.

== Life cycle ==
Dictyocaulus viviparus is ovi-viviparous and gives birth to eggs which are coughed up and eaten. These eggs hatch in the digestive tract and are then excreted live. They take advantage of sporulating Pilobilus fungi for dispersal. When eaten, the larvae chew through the intestinal wall to the mesenteric lymph nodes. From there, they travel to the lungs via circulating blood and/or lymph.
