= Elaphostrongylus =

Scientific classification
- Domain: Eukaryota
- Kingdom: Animalia
- Phylum: Nematoda
- Class: Chromadorea
- Order: Rhabditida
- Family: Protostrongylidae
- Genus: Elaphostrongylus; Cameron, 1931

Genus of roundworms

Elaphostrongylus is a genus of parasitic nematodes in the family Protostrongylidae.

== Species ==
- Elaphostrongylus cervi Cameron, 1931
- Elaphostrongylus panticola Lubinov, 1945
- Elaphostrongylus rangiferi Mitskevich, 1958
- Elaphostrongylus alces Steen et al., 1989

== Life cycle ==
Intermediate hosts of Elaphostrongylus spp. are terrestrial gastropods and they include:

- Limax cinereoniger
- Malacolimax tenellus
- Succinea spp.
- Vitrina pellucida
- Zonitoides nitidus

Experimental hosts of Elaphostrongylus spp. can also be freshwater snails. For example Lymnaea stagnalis has been experimentally infected with Elaphostrongylus rangiferi.

Elaphostrongylus spp. causes cerebral nematodiasis. Definitive host include Cervidae: moose Alces alces, Cervus elaphus and reindeer Rangifer tarandus.
