= Subsporangial vesicle =

A subsporangial vesicle is a vesicle which is below the sporangium on a fungus.

Is often used in the turgor-building and release to launch the sporangium from the stalk of the fungus using this spore-dispersal method.

An example of this is the subsporangial vesicle in Pilobolus, which fills with fluid creating turgor pressure that is then released, launching the sporangium out towards the light, with the purpose of landing on a plant.
