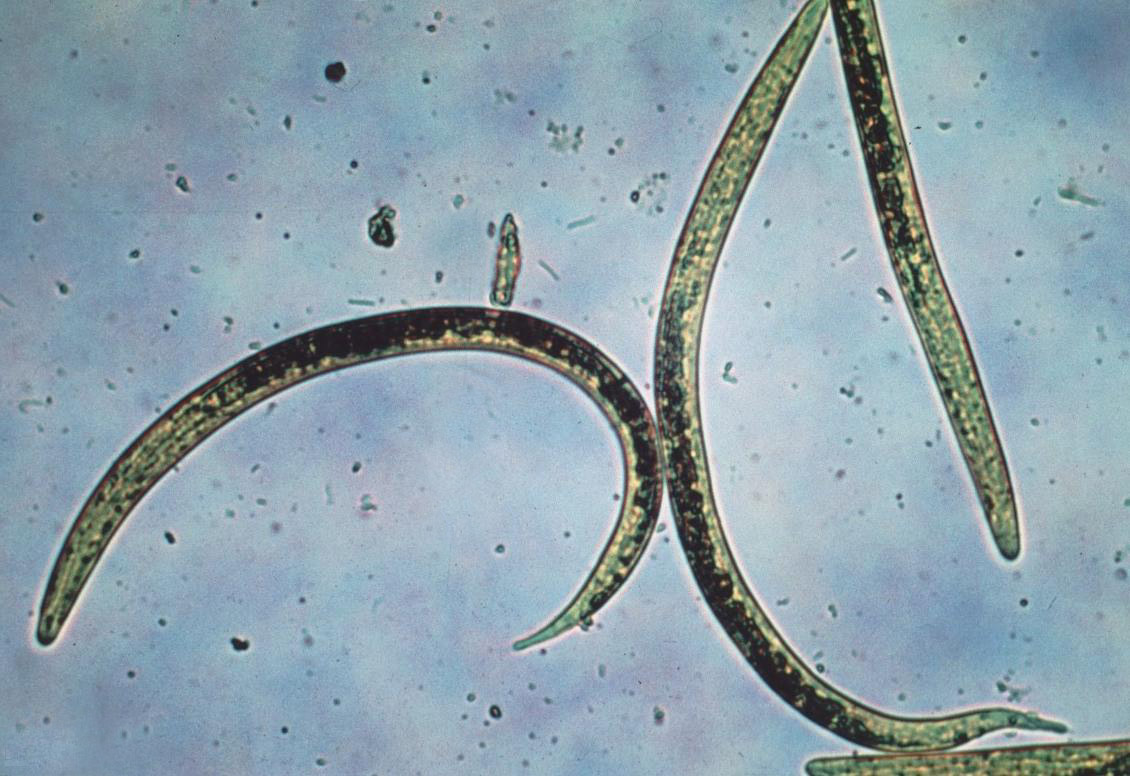
- Dictyocaulus viviparus, larval stage

Scientific classification
- Kingdom: Animalia
- Phylum: Nematoda
- Class: Chromadorea
- Order: Rhabditida
- Family: Dictyocaulidae
- Genus: Dictyocaulus

Species
- Dictyocaulus arnfieldi; Dictyocaulus capreolus; Dictyocaulus cervi; Dictyocaulus eckerti (red deer lungworm); Dictyocaulus filaria (sheep and goat lungworm); Dictyocaulus noerneri; Dictyocaulus viviparus (bovine lungworm); Dictyocaulus xanthopygus (red deer lungworm)

= Dictyocaulus =

Genus of parasitic roundworms

Dictyocaulus is a genus of nematode parasites of the bronchial tree of horses, sheep, goats, deer, and cattle. Dictyocaulus arnfieldi is the lungworm of horses, and Dictyocaulus viviparus is the lungworm affecting ruminants.

== Dictyocaulus viviparus: lungworm of cattle, deer ==
Dictyocaulus viviparus is the most common lungworm of cattle; the infection is also known as husk or parasitic bronchitis. Although classified as the same parasite, some people believe that the D. viviparus of deer and elk should be reclassified as a different species, including D. eckertii in New Zealand. However, both species have been shown capable of cross-infecting cattle and cervids (at least in New Zealand) .

The parasite has a simple but interesting life cycle, with dispersal facilitated by a fungus.

Adult D. viviparus worms reside in the bronchial tree of the animal's lungs. They lay eggs into the airways (bronchi). These eggs are coughed up and subsequently swallowed by the host. The eggs hatch into Stage 1 larvae (L1) in the gastrointestinal tract of the ruminant host. These L1 larvae are shed in the feces or manure. In the feces, larvae mature through two stages and become infective as L3 stage larvae. Cattle feces supports the growth of Pilobolus sp. fungi. The L3 larvae of D. viviparus invade the inside of these fungi, and wait in the fungal sporangium. When the fungus sporulates, the larvae are dispersed as much as 10 feet in a pasture.

Cattle grazing then ingest the L3 larvae. These larvae go through the intestinal system and penetrate the intestinal wall. They use the lymphatic system to reach the mesenteric lymph nodes, where they mature once again into L4 stage larvae. The L4 larvae use the blood supply and the lymphatic system to reach the lungs, where they become adults. The life cycle is completed.

== Symptoms of Dictyocaulus viviparus ==
Symptoms of D. viviparus can include coughing, rapid shallow breathing, expiratory dyspnea, tactile fremitus, serous nasal discharge, pyrexia, increased pulse rate, weight loss, and diarrhea.

== Diagnosis of Dictyocaulus viviparus infection ==
1. Microscope detection of L1 larvae in feces
2. Microscope detection of eggs or larvae in the coughed up sputum or bronchoalveolar lavage fluid from affected animal
3. Blood serology test for worm antigens (available in some countries / states)

== Treatment of lungworm infections ==
Treatment of a D. viviparus infection should be considered if chances of reinfection are high. This would include situations with high stocking rates, longer grazing seasons, and grazing on pastures where infected cattle have grazed. If treatment is decided, ivermectin, albendazole, fenbendazole, febantel and other anthelmintics will target the lungworm. Pasture management should take into consideration the infectiveness of these organisms since the larvae can survive in the soil for extended periods of time.

== Dictyocaulus arnfieldi in horses and donkeys ==
Dictyocaulus arnfieldi is similar to D. viviparus in cattle, but only affects equids. Donkeys usually show no disease and can be silent carriers (and shedders) of this parasite, which causes clinical signs in horses. Routine deworming of horses and donkeys may help prevent cross infection when kept together. Pastures that housed donkeys may be infected with lungworm larvae. As a result, horses and donkeys should not be grazed together. These drugs are given with three weeks intervals between treatments.
