= Lungworm =

Parasitic worms that infest lungs

Lungworms are parasitic nematode worms of the order Strongylida that infest the lungs of vertebrates. The name is used for a variety of different groups of nematodes, some of which also have other common names; what they have in common is that they migrate to their hosts' lungs or respiratory tracts, and cause bronchitis or pneumonia. The lungworm will gradually damage the airways or lung tissue by inciting an inflammatory reaction inside the tissue. Ultimately, the parasites survive and reproduce in the respiratory tissues. The category is thus more a descriptive than a precisely taxonomic one.

The most common lungworms belong to one of two groups, the superfamily Trichostrongyloidea or the superfamily Metastrongyloidea, but not all the species in these superfamilies are lungworms.

The lungworms in the superfamily Trichostrongyloidea include several species in the genus Dictyocaulus which infest hoofed animals, including most common domestic species. Different species are found in cattle and deer (D. viviparus), donkeys and horses (D. arnfeldi), and sheep and goats (D. filaria). These animals have direct life-cycles. The lungworms in the superfamily Metastrongyloidea include species that infest a wider range of mammals, including sheep, goats and pigs but also cats and dogs.

These include Metastrongylus elongatus (apri), found in pigs; Oslerus osleri found in dogs; and Aelurostrongylus abstrusus found in cats. Some of these have indirect, and complex, life-cycles; several of them involve slugs or snails as intermediate hosts, where the habit of sniffing at slug trails, or even licking them, causes the parasite egg to enter the dog's respiratory tract. In the case of A. abstrusus the cat is normally infected by eating a bird or rodent that has itself eaten the original host.

== Lifecycle ==
The general life cycle of a lungworm begins with an ingestion of infective larvae. The infective larvae then penetrate the intestinal wall where larvae migrate into the lungs through the bloodstream. The infected larvae reside in the lungs until the development into an adult lungworm. The eggs of the adult hatch thus producing L1 larvae. The eggs or L1 larvae that reside in the lungs are coughed up and then ingested back into the stomach and released into the environment via the feces. Infected wildlife or dogs will quickly contaminate their environment with many lungworm larvae increasing the risk for reinfection or for infection to others.

== Symptoms ==
The most common symptom is coughing and other typical symptoms are wheezing and weight loss. These symptoms are caused by larvae that reside in the lungs where immunity develops and the accumulation of mucus cause blockage of the airway into the lungs.

== Diagnosis ==
If an animal is suspected of lungworm infection, there are many ways to detect this parasitic infection such as performing one or more of the following techniques: a complete medical history including lung auscultation (stethoscope examination), doing a chest X ray, fecal examination for detection of ova or larvae, examination of respiratory secretions for ova or larvae, and/or a complete blood count (CBC) to check for signs of increase in eosinophils,

While examination of feces is more commonly performed in cattle as a diagnostic, transtracheal wash cytology can occasionally yield lungworm eggs in infected animals.

== Treatment ==
Lungworm infestations can cause significant distress to the animal but are usually treatable with drugs. If infected with lungworm parasite, an anti-parasite drug must be administered.

In the case of a severe reaction, an anti-inflammatory drug of corticosteroids may be given for a brief period (3 to 10 days).

To treat tissue inflammation, the corticosteroid prednisone is usually given (5–10 days). However, there are some side effects such as increased urination or appetite.

The drugs fenbendazole or moxidectin are usually administered to kill the parasite.

There are several different lungworm parasites that have been identified. Although they all originate from the lungworm parasite, they are treated somewhat differently and requires a combination of various drugs to treat the parasite.

== Prevention ==
Repeat chest X-rays in 2 and 4 weeks after treatment. Also, recheck a fecal sample to monitor for the presence of larvae or ova in 2 to 4 weeks. This will confirm if the parasite is still living inside the respiratory tissue.

== In popular culture ==
Lungworms and other sheep parasites feature heavily in the 20th century novel Independent People (Sjálfstætt fólk) by Icelandic author Halldór Laxness.
