= Protostrongylus =

Scientific classification
- Kingdom: Animalia
- Phylum: Nematoda
- Class: Chromadorea
- Order: Rhabditida
- Family: Protostrongylidae
- Genus: Protostrongylus; Kamensky, 1905

Genus of roundworms

Protostrongylus is a genus of nematodes belonging to the family Protostrongylidae.

The species of this genus are found in Europe and Northern America.

Species:

- Protostrongylus brevispiculatum Micacic, 1940
- Protostrongylus commutatus (Diesing, 1851)
- Protostrongylus cuniculorum Joyeux & Gaud, 1946
- Protostrongylus davtiani Savina, 1940
- Protostrongylus hobmaieri Schulz, Orlow & Kutass, 1933
- Protostrongylus kamenskyi Schulz, 1930
- Protostrongylus muraschkinzewi (Davtian, 1940)
- Protostrongylus oryctolagi Baboš, 1955
- Protostrongylus pulmonalis (Frölich, 1802)
- Protostrongylus raillieti (Schulz, Orlow & Kutass, 1933)
- Protostrongylus rufescens (Leuckart, 1865)
- Protostrongylus rupicaprae Gebauer, 1932
- Protostrongylus tauricus Schulz & Kadenazii, 1949
