= Protostrongylidae =

Scientific classification
- Kingdom: Animalia
- Phylum: Nematoda
- Class: Chromadorea
- Order: Rhabditida
- Superfamily: Metastrongyloidea
- Family: Protostrongylidae; Leiper, 1926

Family of nematodes

Protostrongylidae is a family of nematodes belonging to the order Rhabditida.

Genera:

- Cystocaulus Schulz et al., 1933
- Dukerostrongylus Dinnik & Boev, 1982
- Elaphostrongylus Cameron, 1931
- Imparispiculus Luo Jianzhong, Duo Jiecaidan & Chen Gang, 1988
- Muellerius Cameron, 1927
- Neostrongylus Gebauer, 1932
- Orthostrongylus Dougherty & Goble, 1946
- Parelaphostrongylus Boev & Schultz, 1950
- Pneumocaulus Schulz & Andreeva, 1948
- Pneumostrongylus Mönnig, 1932
- Protostrongylus Kamensky, 1905
- Skrjabinocaulus Boev & Sulimov, 1963
- Spiculocaulus Schulz, Orlov & Kutass, 1933
- Umingmakstrongylus Hoberg, Polley, Gunn & Nishi, 1995
- Varestrongylus Bhalerao, 1932
