= Cat bite =

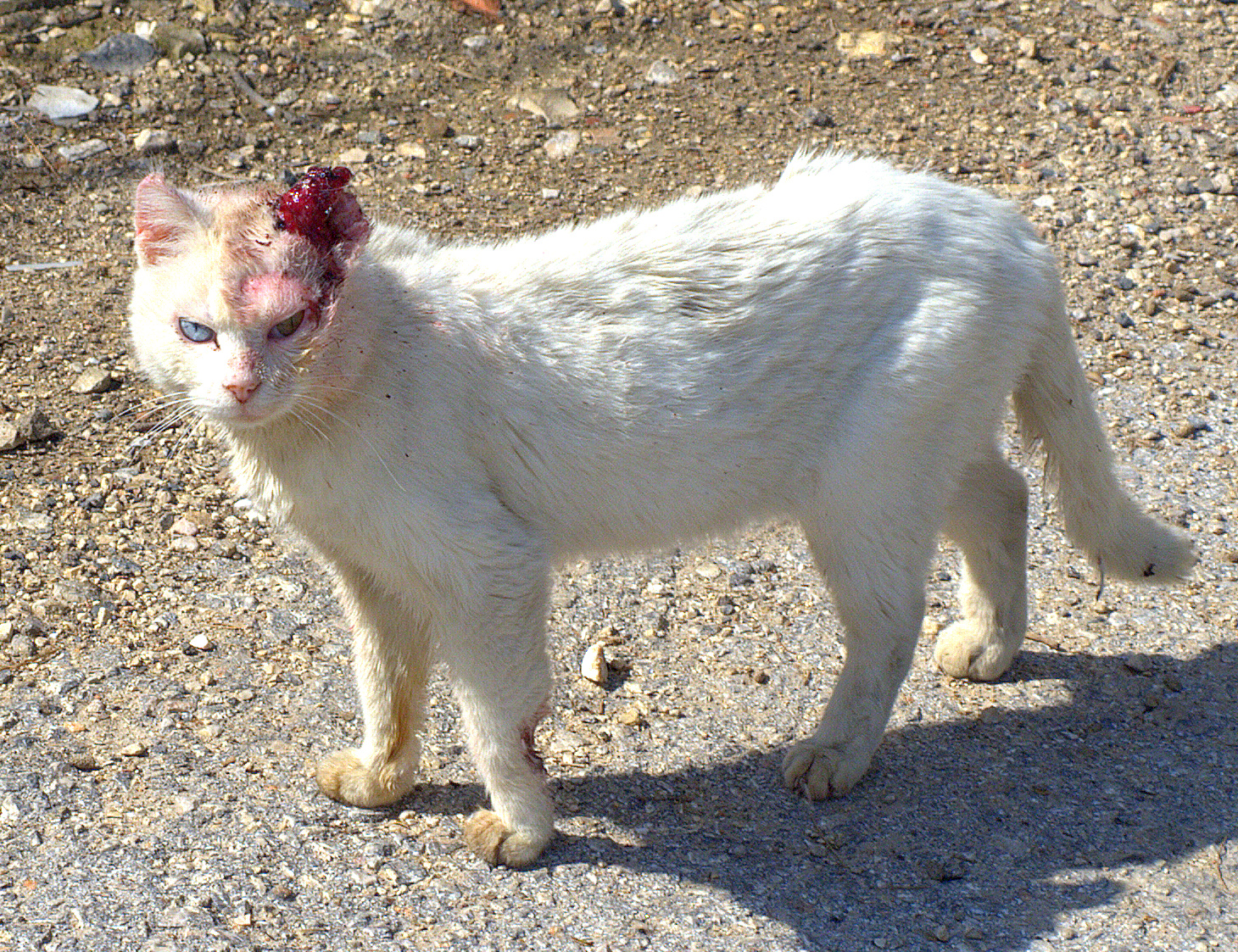
- A cat wounded from the bite of another cat
- Specialty: Emergency medicine, plastic surgery, pediatrics, veterinary medicine

Cat bites are bites inflicted upon humans, other cats, and other animals by the domestic cat (Felis catus). Data from the United States show that cat bites represent between 5–15% of all animal bites inflicted to humans, but it has been argued that this figure could be the consequence of under-reporting as bites made by cats are considered by some to be unimportant. Though uncommon, cat bites can transmit rabies, cause health complications, and, in rare cases, lead to death.

== Signs and symptoms ==
Cat bites are usually considered minor injuries but can result in serious infection and cause rabies if inflicted by a rabid cat. Common symptoms include pain and swelling around the affected area. Sometimes, direct tissue damage from the cat bite can impair mobility or cause tenosynovitis or arthritis. In these cases, surgical consultation is needed to assess severity. Some unusual complications, like deep-vein thrombosis, subcutaneous emphysema and fetal tachycardia have been described. Some of the infections acquired from a cat bite can be acquired otherwise, like plague.

== Infections ==
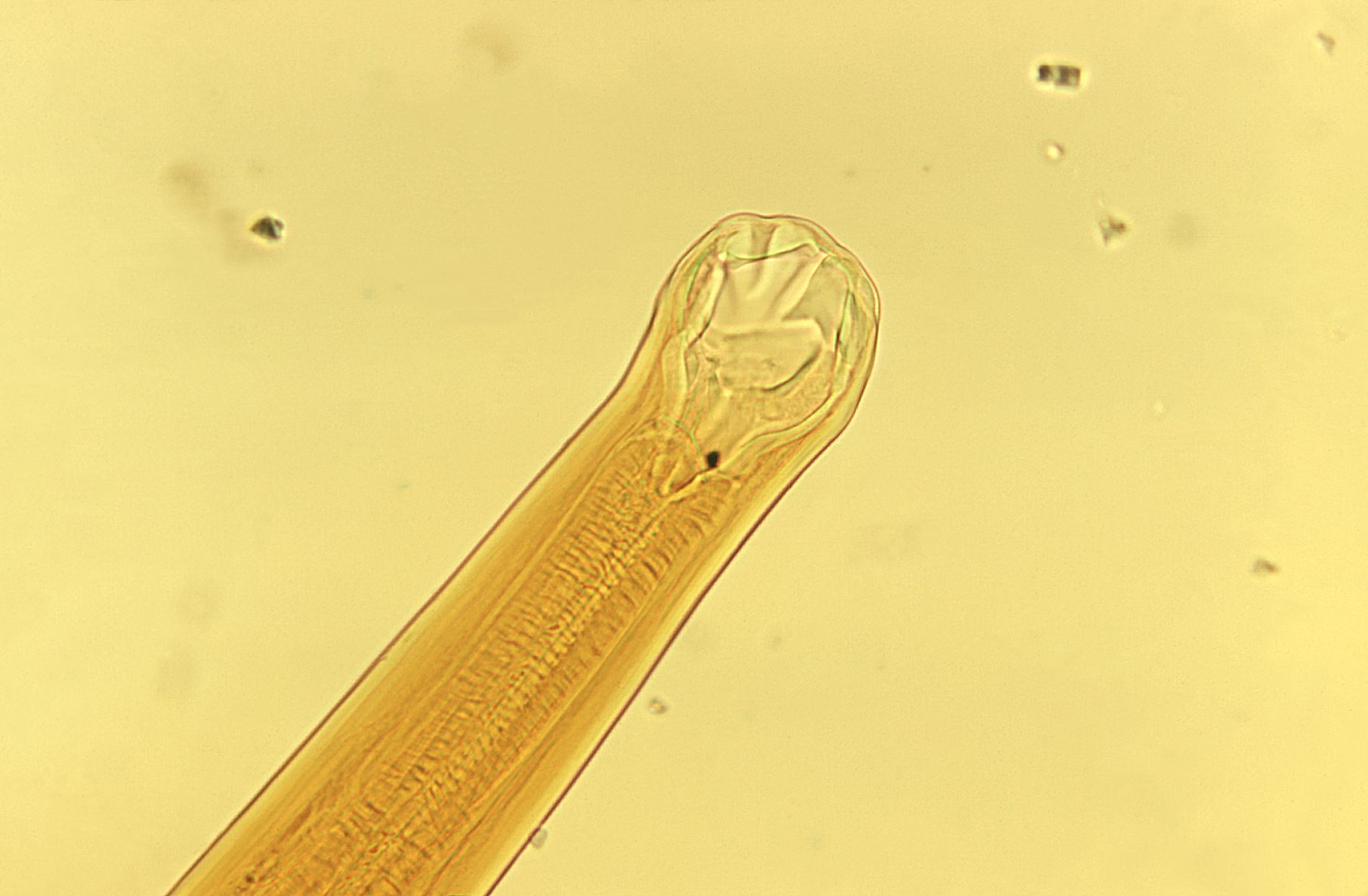
Ancylostoma braziliense mouthparts

The resident flora in the mouth of the domestic cat includes Pasteurella, Staph, Bartonella, Globicatella and Streptococcus species. Bites from cats develop infections more frequently than bites from dogs. The teeth of a cat are sharp, pointed and can cause deep wounds. After a cat bite, the skin usually closes rapidly over the bite and may trap microorganisms. The bite from a cat can infect a person with:

- Cat-scratch disease, caused by the bacterium Bartonella henselae
  - Cat-scratch disease is a bacterial disease that people may get after being bitten or scratched by a cat. About 40% of cats carry the bacteria at some time in their mouths, although kittens younger than one year of age are more likely to have it. Most cats with this infection show no signs of illness.
- Hookworm, Ancylostoma tubaeforme, Ancylostoma braziliense, and Uncinaria stenocephala
- Capnocytophaga canimorsus
- Pasteurellosis caused by the bacterial genus Pasteurella
  - Pasteurellosis is a bacterial disease associated with animal bites and scratches. Pasteurella spp is a normal bacterium that also lives in the mouths of healthy cats. The bacteria do not typically make cats sick; however, cats can develop abscesses or skin infections in places where they were scratched or bitten by another animal.
  - In people, pasteurellosis causes painful wounds and skin infections. In severe cases, it can cause widespread infection and might even affect the nervous system.
- Rabies, a fatal neurologic disease in animals and people, is caused by a virus. Animals and people are most commonly infected through bites from rabid animals. Infected cats may have a variety of signs, but most often have sudden behavioral changes and progressive paralysis.

== Diagnosis ==
The diagnosis is aided by obtaining a history of the circumstances surrounding the bite. The time the bite was experienced, the location of the bite, and examination of the bite are noted. The person may have drainage from the site of the bite. They may also be febrile, and swelling around the wound may occur. Because the wound from the bite may heal too quickly over the punctures, it may need to be opened and explored. Hydrogen peroxide may be used at home to reopen the wound, with pressure being applied around the wound to drain any abscesses. For deep wounds, this process may need to be repeated. At a hospital, the patient may request that the site be anesthetized before exploration. Neurovascular status is assessed. Immune status may determine treatment, as does the presence of transplanted tissue or organs, rheumatic disease, diabetes, HIV/AIDS, and sickle cell disease. Swollen lymph nodes and red streaks radiating upward may be evident.

The diagnosis of a cat with rabies is usually evident by observing the cat. Cats with rabies may also appear restless, pant, and attack other animals, people, or objects. Animals with rabies typically die within a few days of appearing sick. Vaccination of the cat can prevent rabies from being transmitted by the cat through a bite. If the cat is suspected of being infected with rabies, the person bitten will immediately begin treatment with rabies vaccine.

== Prevention ==
Cat bites can often be prevented by:

- avoiding cats
- instructing children not to tease cats or other pets
- being cautious with unfamiliar cats
- approaching cats with care, even if they appear to be friendly
- avoiding rough play with cats and kittens.

== Treatment ==
Cat bites are treated by washing and then irrigating the bite wound with water and isopropyl alcohol. Often, a tetanus shot is prescribed. Suturing may be required in severe injuries. A person who has been bitten by a cat with rabies will need specialized treatment. If a cat has bitten someone, and there is no evidence that the cat has been vaccinated against rabies, the person will be treated for rabies infection.

== Epidemiology ==
Over 400,000 cat bites are reported each year in the U.S., though the actual number of bites may be much higher. 40 million households in the United States have domestic cats. Data on the number of people bitten or scratched by cats is limited because most of these incidents are not reported; however, 20–80% of cat bites and scratches become infected. Cat-scratch disease or cat-scratch fever, an infection that causes fever and swollen lymph nodes, can develop from cat scratches, even if they only break the surface of the skin. Based on reports of people treated for cat bites at hospitals, women are most likely to be victims of cat bites and scratches. Because of their smaller build, children are more likely to be bitten on their head, neck and face. Adults are more likely to be bitten on the hands and arms. Those who are immunocompromised are more susceptible to infection from a cat bite.

Data show that cat bites are more common found in women than in men, and in older adults, particularly those over 75 years old. Cat bites are more frequent in the mornings, during spring and summer. The most commonly affected human body part are the arms. Attackers are usually stray females.

== See also ==
- Coyote attacks on humans
- Dog bite
- Rabies
- Wolf attacks on humans
