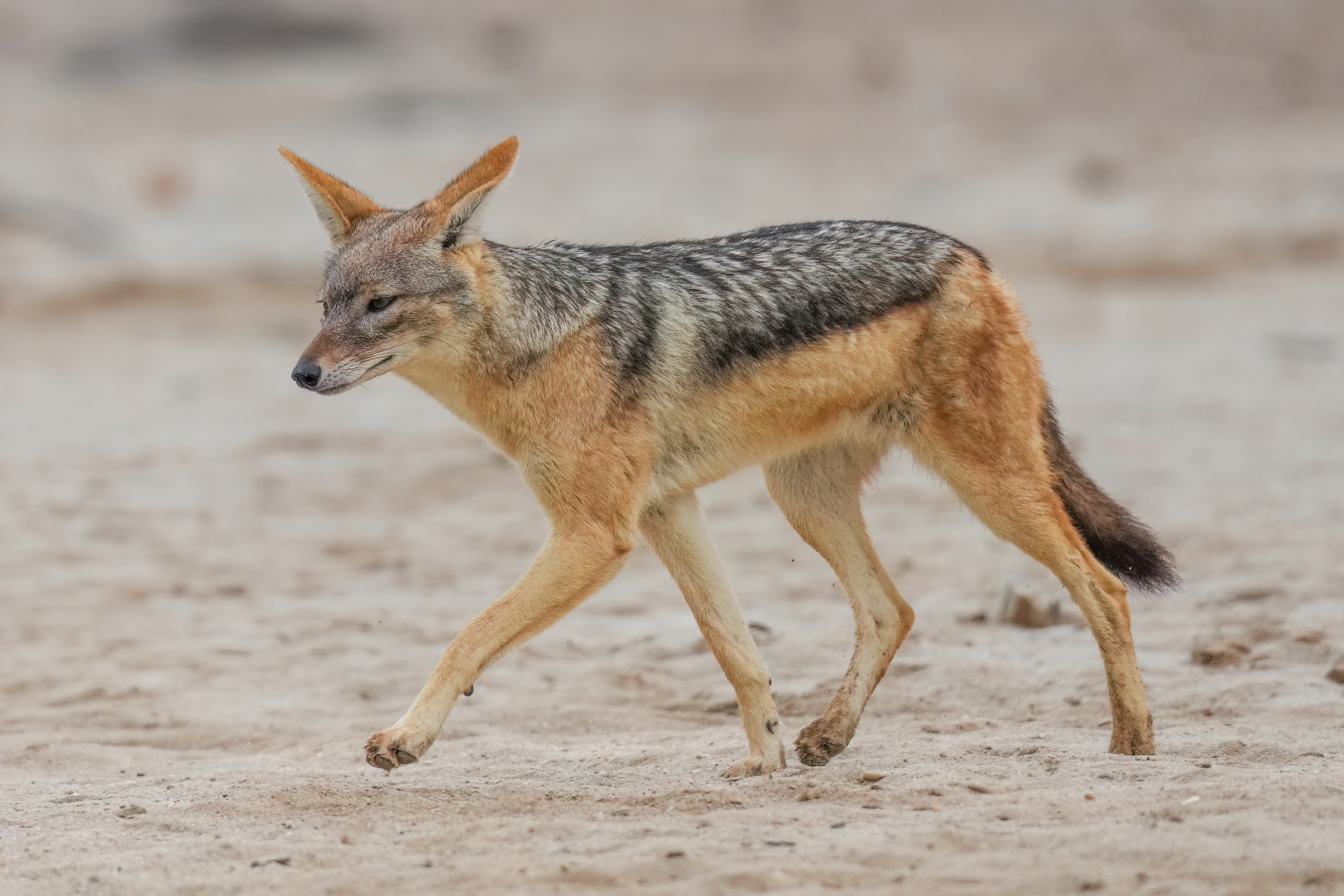
- L. m. mesomelas Cape Cross, Namibia
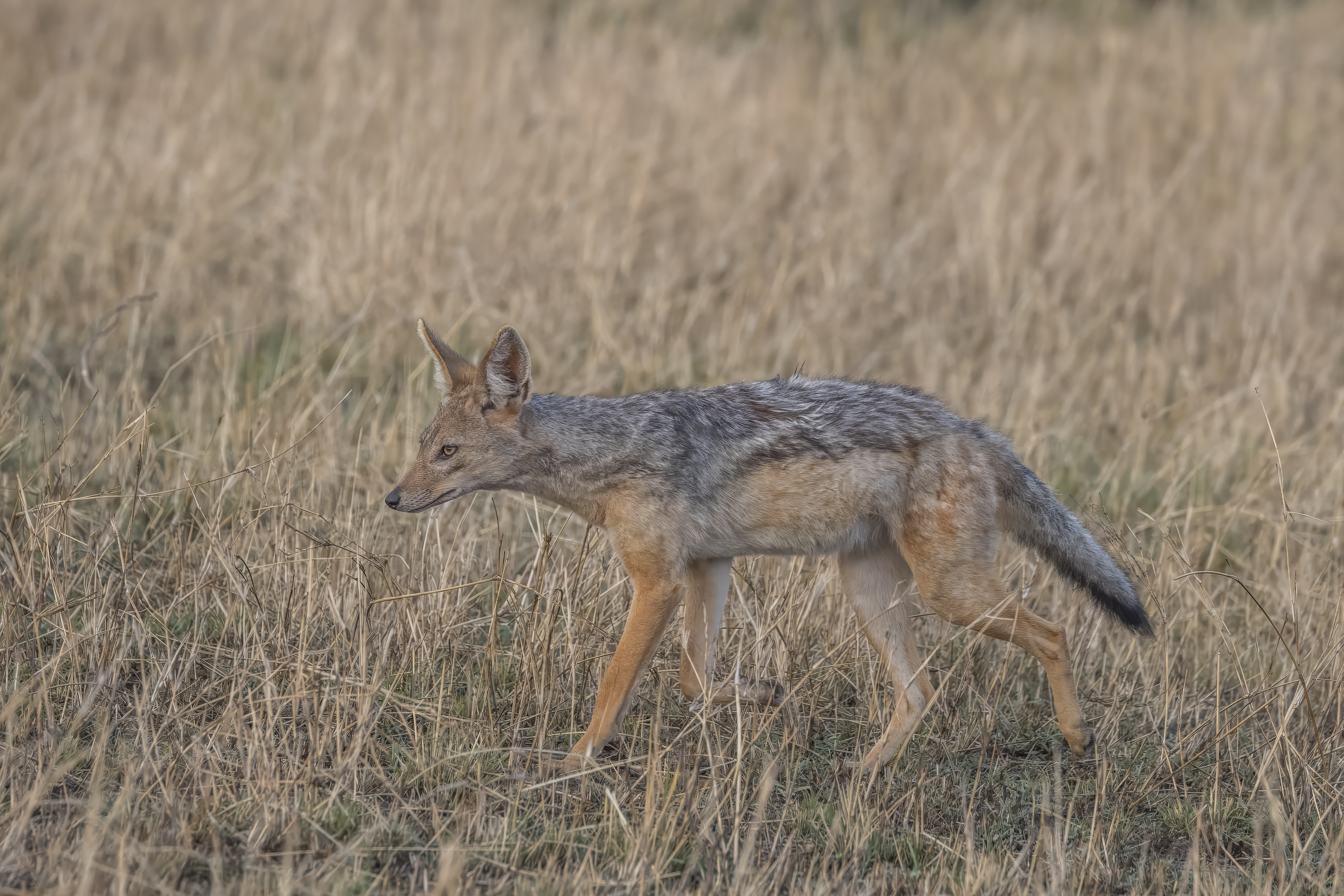
- L. m. schmidti Serengeti National Park, Tanzania

Conservation status
- Least Concern (IUCN 3.1)

Scientific classification
- Kingdom: Animalia
- Phylum: Chordata
- Class: Mammalia
- Order: Carnivora
- Family: Canidae
- Genus: Lupulella
- Species: L. mesomelas

Binomial name
- Lupulella mesomelas (Schreber, 1775)

Subspecies
- 2 subspecies, see text
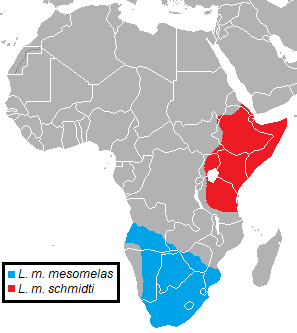
- Black-backed jackal range, with L. m. mesomelas in blue and L. m. schmidti in red

Synonyms
- Canis mesomelas

= Black-backed jackal =

Black-backed jackal Temporal range: Pliocene – recent

Species of carnivore

The black-backed jackal (Lupulella mesomelas) is a medium-sized canine native to eastern and southern Africa. These regions are separated by roughly 900 km (560 mi).

One region includes the southernmost tip of the continent, including South Africa, Namibia, Botswana and Zimbabwe. The other area is along the eastern coastline, including Kenya, Somalia, Djibouti, Eritrea, and Ethiopia. It is listed on the IUCN Red List as least concern due to its widespread range and adaptability, although it is still persecuted as a livestock predator and rabies vector.

It has a reddish brown to tan coat and a black saddle that extends from the shoulders to the base of the tail. It is a monogamous animal, whose young may remain with the family to help raise new generations of pups. The black-backed jackal has a wide array of food sources, feeding on small to medium-sized animals, as well as plant matter and human refuse.

It also plays a prominent role in African folklore, often depicted as a cunning and adaptable trickster figure. Despite ongoing conflict with humans due to livestock predation, its populations remain stable thanks to its resilience and adaptability across diverse landscapes.

== Taxonomy and evolution ==
Phylogenetic tree of the wolf-like canids with timing in millions of years (Note: For a full set of supporting references refer to the note (a) in the phylotree at Evolution of the wolf#Wolf-like canids)

- Caninae 3.5 Ma
  - 3.0
    - 2.5
      - 2.0
        - 0.96
          - 0.6
            - 0.38
              - - - Domestic dog
                  - Gray wolf
              - Coyote
            - African wolf
          - Golden jackal
        - Ethiopian wolf
      - Dhole
    - African wild dog
  - - 2.6
      - Side-striped jackal
      - Black-backed jackal

Johann Christian Daniel von Schreber named Canis mesomelas in 1775. It was later proposed as the genus Lupulella Hilzheimer 1906.

The black-backed jackal has lived in eastern and southern Africa for at least 2–3 million years, as shown by fossil deposits in Kenya, Tanzania, and South Africa. Specimens from fossil sites in Transvaal are almost identical to their modern counterparts, but have slightly different nasal bones. As no fossils have been found north of Ethiopia, the species likely has always been sub-Saharan in distribution. The black-backed jackal is relatively unspecialised, and can thrive in a wide variety of habitats, including deserts, as its kidneys are well adapted for water deprivation. It is, however, more adapted to a carnivorous diet than the other jackals, as shown by its well-developed carnassial shear and the longer cutting blade of the premolars.

Juliet Clutton-Brock and colleagues classified the black-backed jackal to be closely related to the side-striped jackal, based on cranial and dental characters. Studies on allozyme divergence within the Canidae indicate that the black-backed jackal and other members of the genus Canis are separated by a considerable degree of genetic distance. Further studies show a large difference in mitochondrial DNA sequences between black-backed jackals and other sympatric "jackal" species, consistent with divergence 2.3–4.5 million years ago.

A mitochondrial DNA sequence alignment for the wolf-like canids gave a phylogenetic tree with the side-striped jackal and the black-backed jackal being the most basal members of this clade, which means that this tree is indicating an African origin for the clade.

Because of this deep divergence between the black-backed jackal and the rest of the "wolf-like" canids, one author has proposed to change the species' generic name from Canis to Lupulella.

In 2017, jackal relationships were further explored, with a mitochondrial DNA study finding that the two black-backed jackal subspecies had diverged from each other 2.5 million years ago to form the south African and east African populations. The study proposes that due to this long separation, which is longer than the separation of the African golden wolf from the wolf lineage, that the two subspecies might warrant separate species status.

In 2019, members of the IUCN SSC Canid Specialist Group recommended that the side-striped jackal (Canis adustus) and black-backed jackal (Canis mesomelas) should be placed in a distinct genus, Lupulella Hilzheimer, 1906 with the names Lupulella adusta and Lupulella mesomelas because DNA evidence shows that they form a monophyletic lineage that sits outside of the Canis/Cuon/Lycaon clade.

Additional genetic research continues to support this separation, indicating that the black-backed jackal is one of the most ancient extant canid species, retaining primitive traits and showing limited evolutionary change since the Pleistocene epoch. Furthermore, molecular analyses have found substantial divergence between the Cape and East African subspecies, with some studies proposing that they may qualify as separate species.

The phylogenetic tree for the wolf-like canids may give conflicting positions for the black-backed jackal and the side-striped jackal relative to the genus Canis members depending on whether the genetic markers were based on mitochondrial DNA or nuclear DNA (from the cell's nucleus). The explanation proposed is that mitochondrial DNA introgression occurred from an ancient ancestor of Canis into the lineage that led to the black-backed jackal around 6.2–5.2 million years ago.

=== Subspecies ===
Two subspecies are recognised by MSW3. These subspecies are geographically separated by a gap which extends northwards from Zambia to Tanzania:

Subspecies	Image	Trinomial authority	Description	Range	Synonyms
Cape black-backed jackal L. m. mesomelas nominate subspecies		Schreber, 1775	See Physical description below.	Cape of Good Hope northward to Angola, Namibia, Zimbabwe, and southern Mozambique.	achrotes (Thomas, 1925) arenarum (Thomas, 1926) variegatoides (A. Smith, 1833)
East African black-backed jackal L. m. schmidti		Noack, 1897	Distinguished from the nominate subspecies by its shorter and wider skull, longer and narrower carnassials, and smaller upper and lower molar grinding areas.	Southern Ethiopia, South Sudan, Somalia, Kenya, Uganda, and northern Tanzania.	elgonae (Heller, 1914) mcmillani (Heller, 1914)

== Description ==
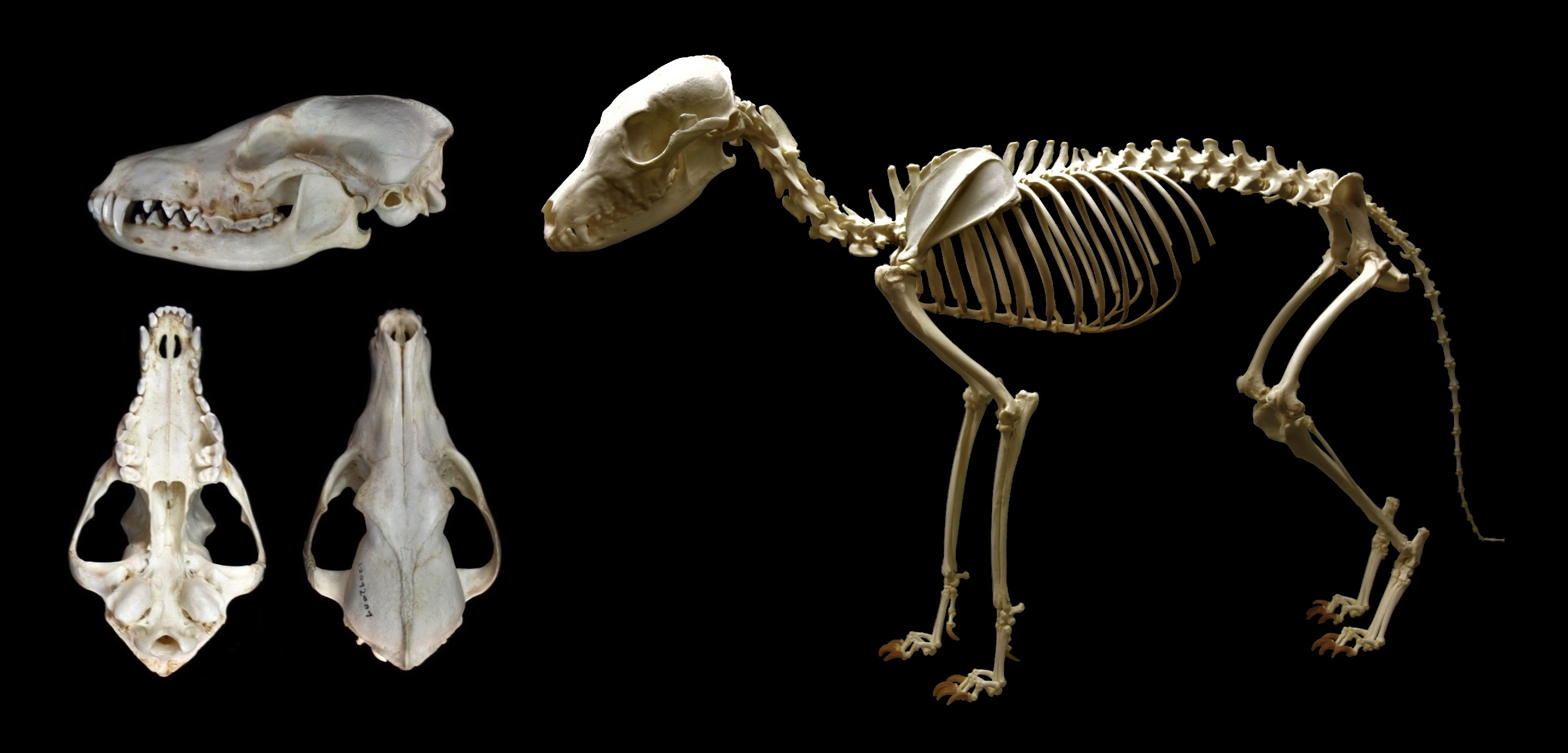
Skull and skeleton

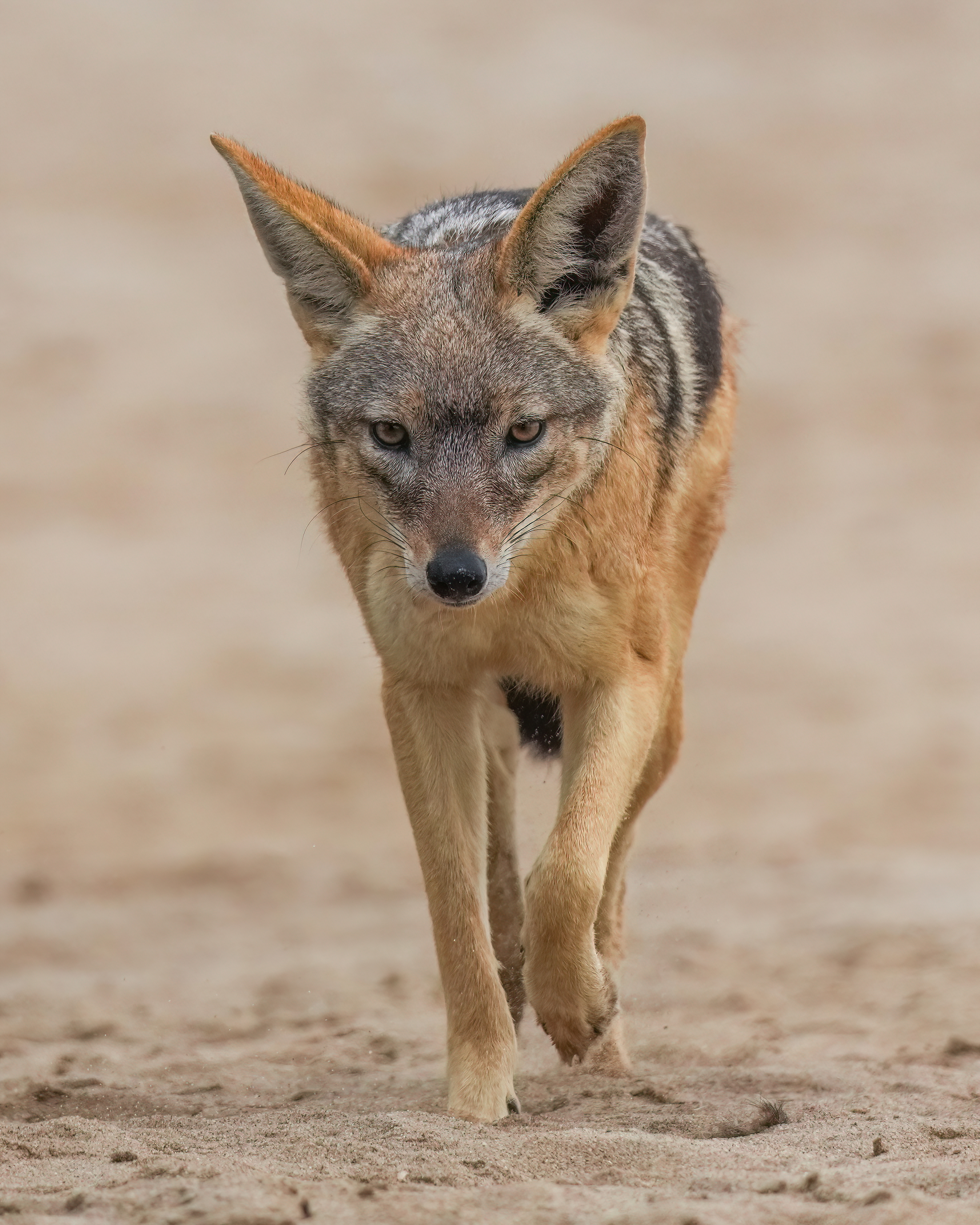
Frontal view of a Black-backed jackal hunting for food at Cape Cross, Namibia

The black-backed jackal is a fox-like canid with a slender body, long legs, and large ears. It is similar to the closely related side-striped jackal and more distantly related to the golden jackal, though its skull and dentition are more robust and the incisors much sharper. It weighs 6–13 kg (13–29 lb), stands 38–48 cm (15–19 in) at the shoulder, and measures 67.3–81.2 cm (26.5–32.0 in) in body length.

The base colour is reddish brown to tan, which is particularly pronounced on the flanks and legs. A black saddle intermixed with silvery hair extends from the shoulders to the base of the tail. A long, black stripe extending along the flanks separates the saddle from the rest of the body, and can be used to differentiate individuals. The tail is bushy and tipped with black. The lips, throat, chest, and inner surface of the limbs are white. The winter coat is a much deeper reddish brown. Albino specimens occasionally occur. The hair of the face measures 10–15 mm in length, and lengthens to 30–40 mm on the rump. The guard hairs of the back are 60 mm on the shoulder, decreasing to 40 mm at the base of the tail. The hairs of the tail are the longest, measuring 70 mm in length.

== Distribution and habitat ==
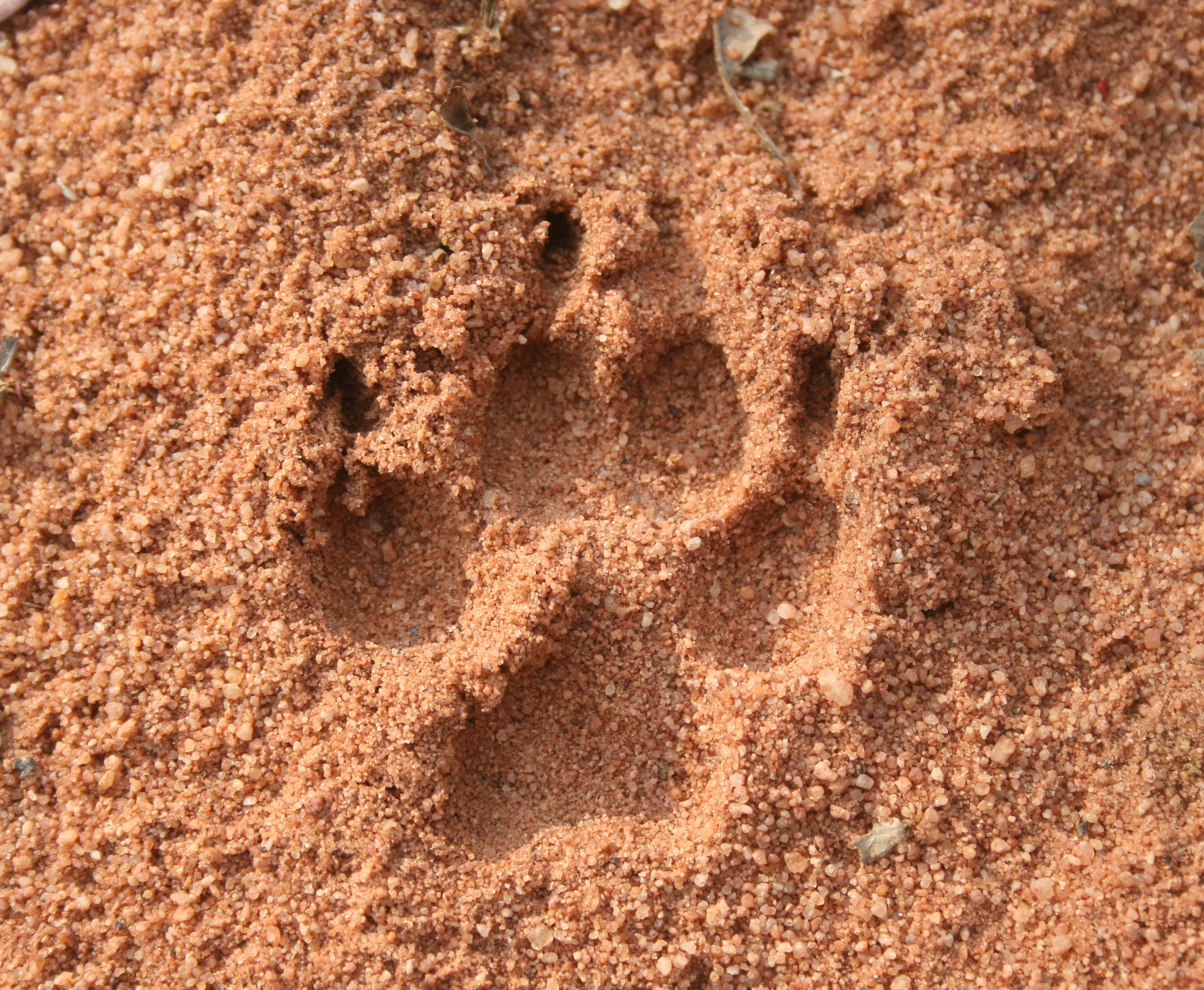
Right front pawprint

The black-backed jackal generally shows a preference for open areas with little dense vegetation, though it occupies a wide range of habitats, from arid coastal deserts to areas with more than 2000 mm of rainfall. In addition to their known range, black-backed jackals have demonstrated exceptional adaptability to human-altered landscapes, including agricultural fields and peri-urban zones. Studies show their presence in environments ranging from semi-desert scrublands to alpine regions, though habitat fragmentation may increase conflict with human interests. It also occurs in farmlands, savannas, open savanna mosaics, and alpine areas.

== Behaviour and ecology ==
=== Social and territorial behaviours ===
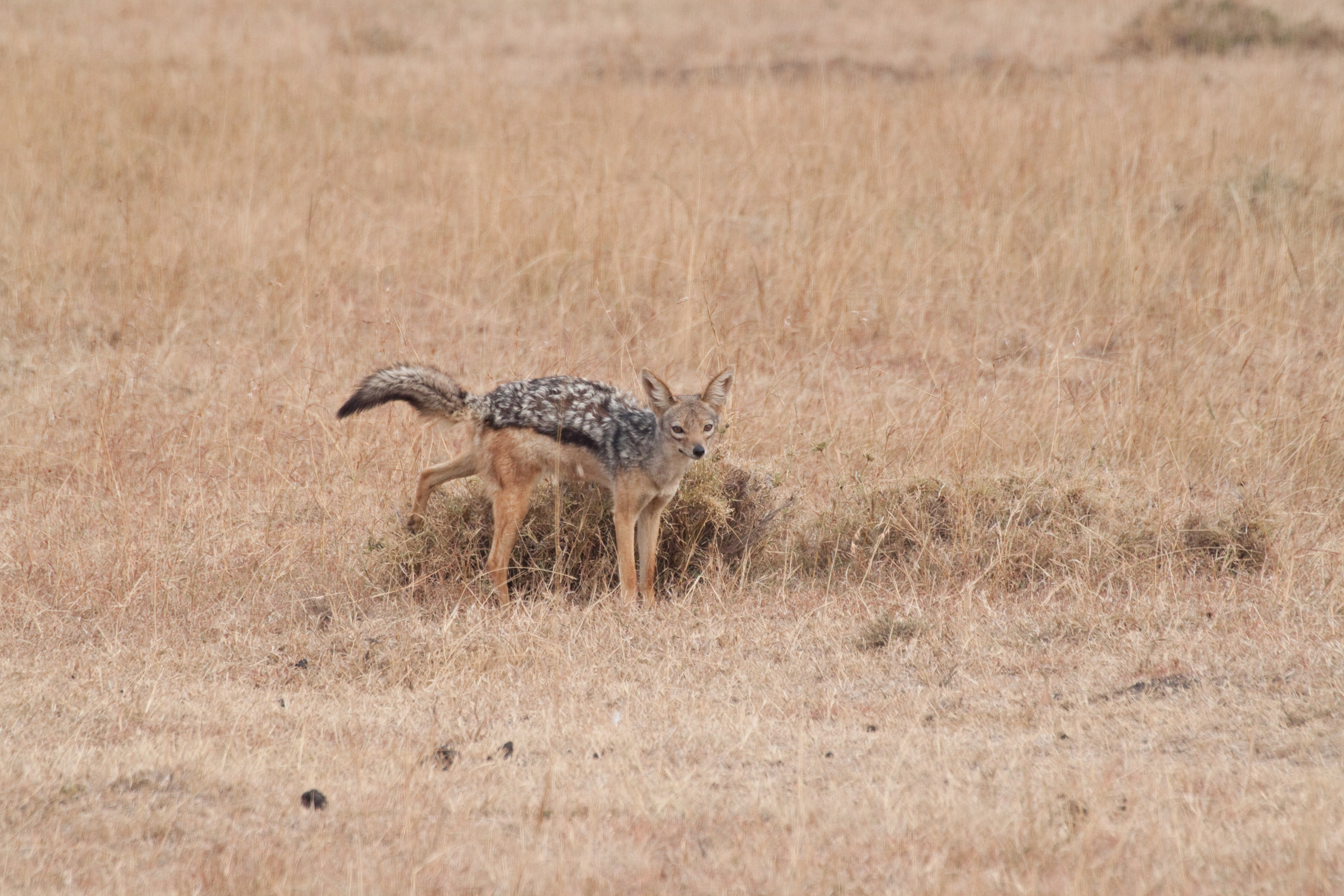
Scent marking

The black-backed jackal is a monogamous and territorial animal, whose social organisation greatly resembles that of the golden jackal. However, the assistance of elder offspring in helping raise the pups of their parents has a greater bearing on pup survival rates than in the latter species. This cooperative breeding behavior is a key component of their social structure, with older offspring often staying behind to support new litters rather than dispersing immediately. These cooperative dynamics help increase pup survival and reinforce familial bonds, contributing to long-term territory stability in certain populations. The basic social unit is a monogamous mated pair which defends its territory through laying faeces and urine on range boundaries. Scent marking is usually done in tandem, and the pair aggressively expels intruders. Such encounters are normally prevented, as the pair vocalises to advertise its presence in a given area. It is a highly vocal species, particularly in Southern Africa. Sounds made by the species include yelling, yelping, woofing, whining, growling, and cackling. It communicates with group members and advertises its presence by a high-pitched, whining howl, and expresses alarm through an explosive cry followed by shorter, high-pitched yelps. This sound is particularly frantic when mobbing a leopard. In areas where the black-backed jackal is sympatric with the African golden wolf, the species does not howl, instead relying more on yelps. In contrast, black-backed jackals in Southern Africa howl much like golden jackals. When trapped, it cackles like a fox.

=== Reproduction and development ===
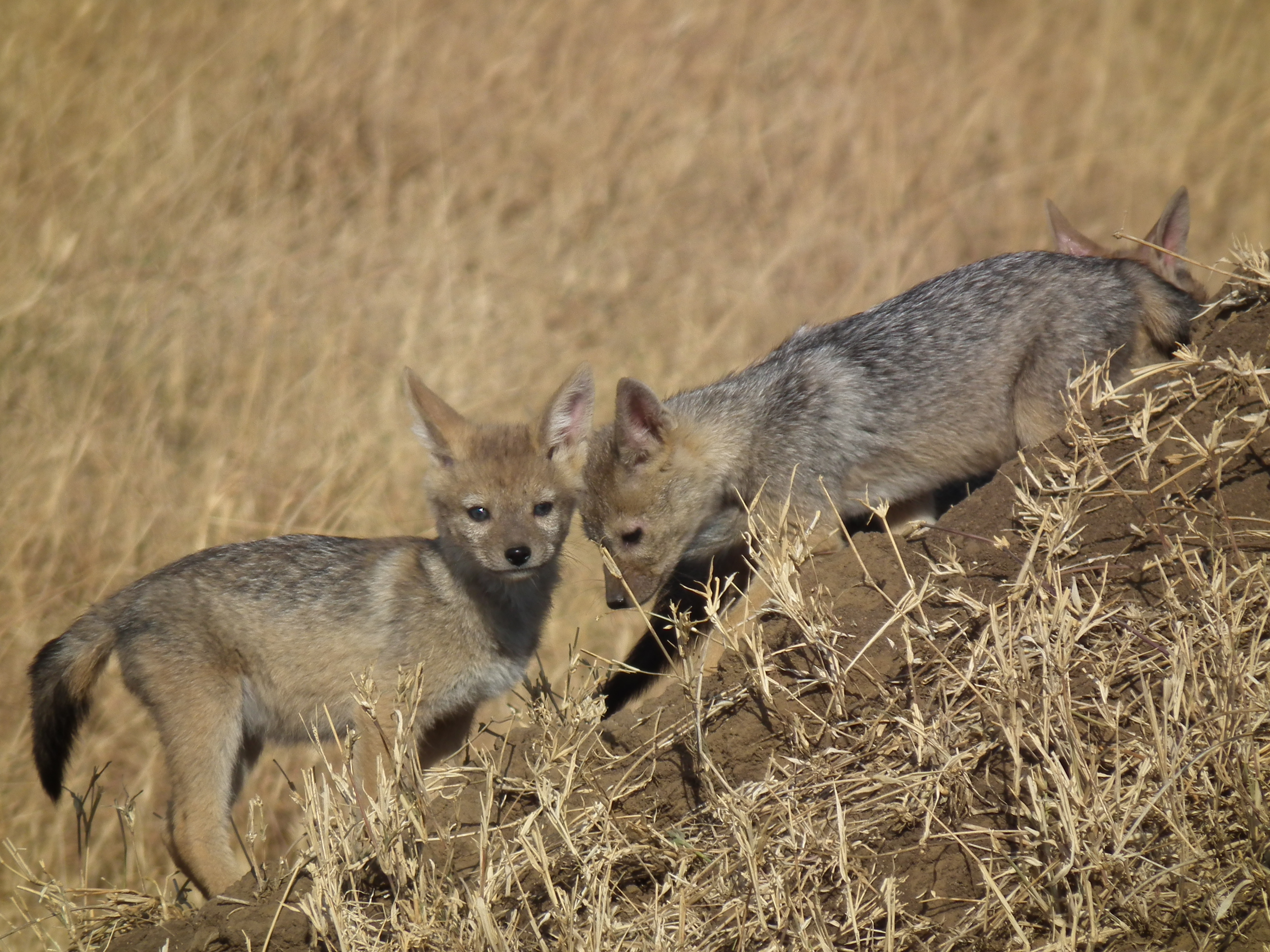
East African black-backed jackal (C. m. schmidti) pups, Tanzania

The mating season takes place from late May to August, with a gestation period of 60 days. Pups are born from July to October. Summer births are thought to be timed to coincide with population peaks of vlei rats and four-striped grass mice, while winter births are timed for ungulate calving seasons. Litters consist of one to nine pups, which are born blind. For the first three weeks of their lives, the pups are kept under constant surveillance by their dam, while the sire and elder offspring provide food. The pups open their eyes after 8–10 days and emerge from the den at the age of 3 weeks. They are weaned at 8–9 weeks, and can hunt by themselves at the age of 6 months. Sexual maturity is attained at 11 months, though few black-backed jackals reproduce in their first year. Unlike golden jackals, which have comparatively amicable intrapack relationships, black-backed jackal pups become increasingly quarrelsome as they age, and establish more rigid dominance hierarchies. Dominant pups appropriate food, and become independent at an earlier age. The grown pups may disperse at one year of age, though some remain in their natal territories to assist their parents in raising the next generation of pups. The average lifespan in the wild is 7 years, though captive specimens can live twice as long.

=== Diet ===
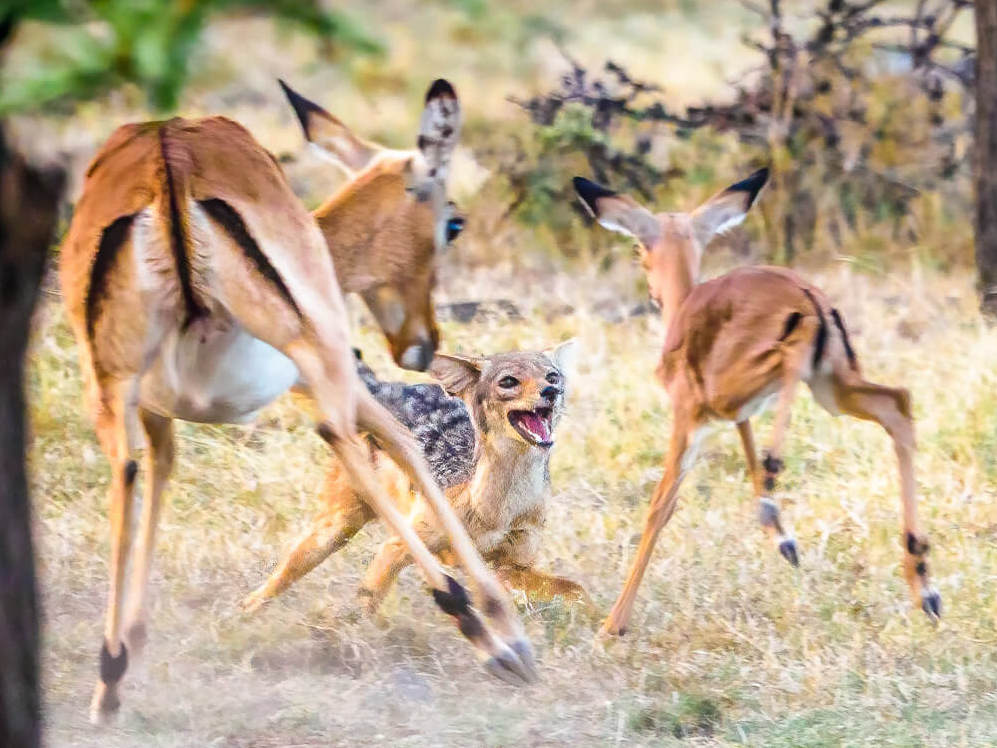
East Africa black-backed jackal (C. m. schmidti) hunting impala calf, Masai Mara, Kenya

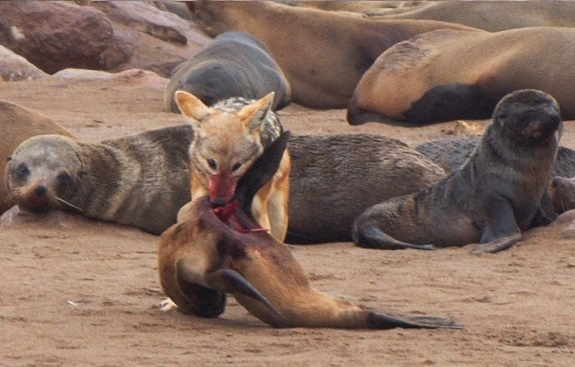
Cape black-backed jackal (C. m. mesomelas) feeding on a brown fur seal pup, Namibia

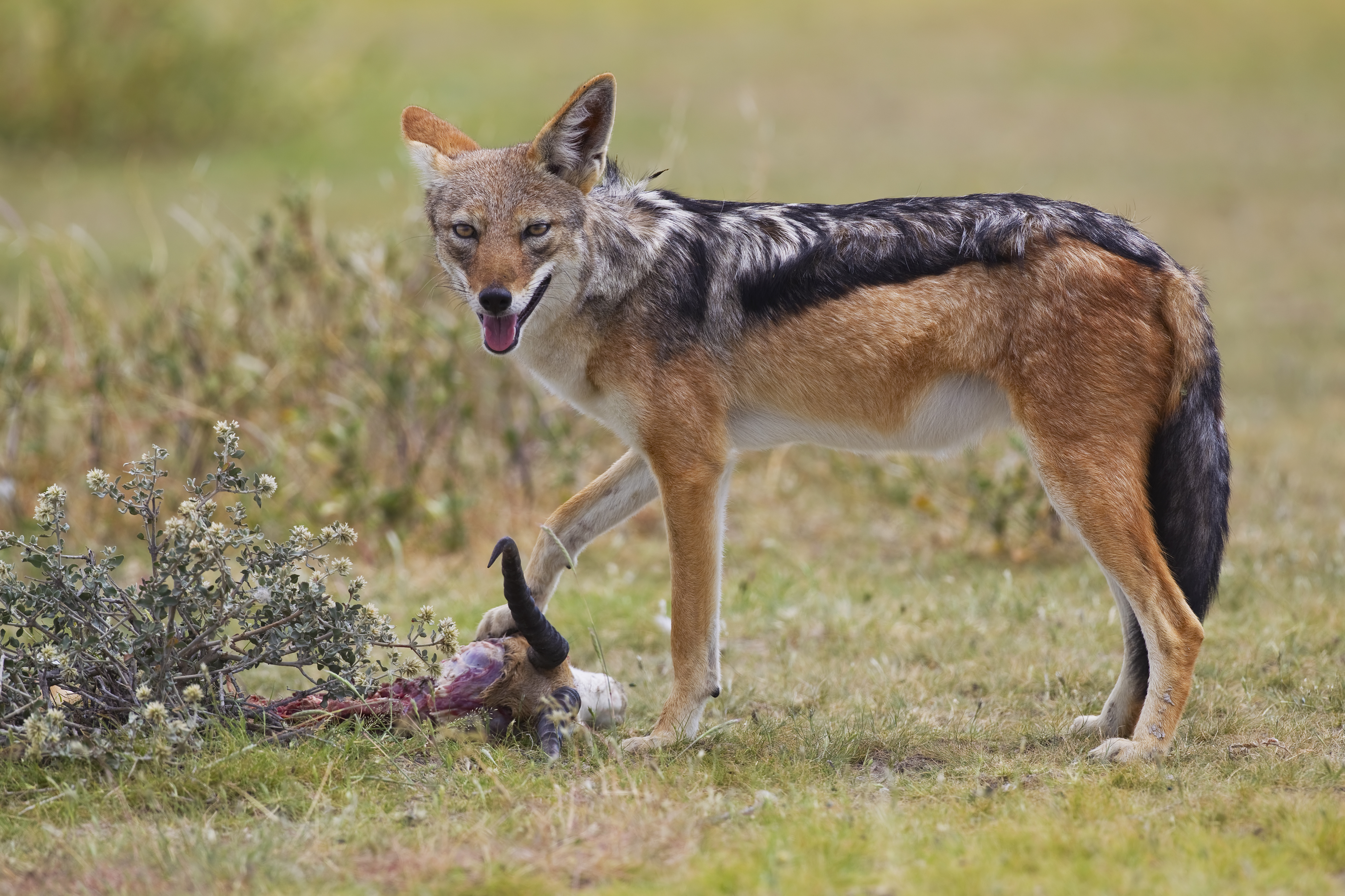
Cape black-backed jackal (C. m. mesomelas) feeding on a springbok carcass in Etosha National Park, Namibia

Black-backed jackals are omnivores. Their diet includes invertebrates, such as beetles, grasshoppers, crickets, termites, millipedes, spiders, and scorpions. Mammals are eaten such as rodents, hares, and young antelopes up to the size of topi calves. They also feed on carrion, birds, bird eggs, lizards and snakes. In coastal areas, they feed on beached marine mammals, seals, fish, and mussels. They also consume occasionally fruits and berries.

In South Africa, black-backed jackals frequently prey on antelopes (primarily impala and springbok and occasionally duiker, reedbuck, and steenbok), carrion, hares, hoofed livestock, insects, and rodents. They also prey on small carnivores, such as mongooses, polecats, and wildcats. On the coastline of the Namib Desert, jackals feed primarily on marine birds (mainly Cape and white-breasted cormorants and jackass penguins), marine mammals (including Cape fur seals), fish, and insects. In East Africa, during the dry season, they hunt the young of gazelles, impalas, topi, tsessebe, and warthogs.

A single jackal is capable of killing a healthy adult impala. Adult dik-diks and Thomson's gazelles seem to be the upper limit of their killing capacity, though they target larger species if those are sick, with one pair having been observed to harass a crippled bull rhinoceros. A pair of black-backed jackals in the Kalahari desert was observed to kill a kori bustard, and on a separate occasion, a black mamba by prolonged harassment of the snake and crushing of the snake's head. They typically kill tall prey by biting at the legs and loins, and frequently go for the throat. Like most canids, the black-backed jackal caches surplus food.

In addition to these behaviors, black-backed jackals are omnivorous and opportunistic. Their diet includes not only small mammals and birds but also invertebrates, fruits, and human waste in agricultural and peri-urban areas. Notably, they play an ecological role as seed dispersers. For example, jackals have been found to facilitate the germination and spread of the !nara melon (Acanthosicyos horridus) in the Namib Desert by consuming the fruit and defecating the seeds, which improves germination success.

The jackals sniff out the ripe melon fruits of the ǃnaras, a leafless, spined drought resilient plant using their jaws to bite through their tough skins. "The chewing molars of canids make them ideal agents for endozoochorous dispersal of large seeds." Such dispersal is long-distance, the size of their home ranges (7–15.9 km). The jackals urinate on buried fruits and later return to them; it is suggested either to mark ownership or mask their smell from rival jackals. Seeds from their droppings germinate better than those extracted directly from ripe fruit. While other carnivores eat other fruits, this seems to be the first case where they might be a plant's primary dispersers. Recent studies have highlighted the black-backed jackal's role as both a predator and ecological contributor, particularly through seed dispersal in arid regions.

=== Livestock predation ===
Black-backed jackals occasionally hunt domestic animals, including dogs, cats, pigs, goats, sheep, and poultry, with sheep tending to predominate. They rarely target cattle, though cows giving birth may be attacked. Jackals can be a serious problem for sheep farmers, particularly during the lambing season. In Ethiopia, local farmers also report frequent conflicts with black-backed jackals, viewing them as significant threats to livestock. Community members in the Konasa Pulasa forest region identify the species as a cause of repeated losses, especially for goats and poultry, and associate jackal presence with economic strain. Sheep losses to black-backed jackals in a 440 km^{2} study area in KwaZulu-Natal consisted of 0.05% of the sheep population. Of 395 sheep killed in a sheep farming area in KwaZulu-Natal, 13% were killed by jackals. Jackals usually kill sheep with a throat bite, and begin feeding by opening the flank and consuming the flesh and skin of the flank, heart, liver, some ribs, haunch of hind leg, and sometimes the stomach and its contents. In older lambs, the main portions eaten are usually heart and liver. Usually, only one lamb per night is killed in any one place, but sometimes two and occasionally three may be killed. The oral history of the Khoikhoi indicates they have been a nuisance to pastoralists long before European settlement. South Africa has been using fencing systems to protect sheep from jackals since the 1890s, though such measures have mixed success, as the best fencing is expensive, and jackals can easily infiltrate cheap wire fences.

=== Enemies and competitors ===
In areas where the black-backed jackal is sympatric with the larger side-striped jackal, the former species aggressively drives out the latter from grassland habitats into woodlands. This is unique among carnivores, as larger species commonly displace smaller ones. Black-backed jackal pups are vulnerable to African wolf, honey badger, spotted hyena and brown hyena. Adults have few natural predators, save for leopards and African wild dogs. Though there are some reports that martial eagles prey on both juveniles and adults.

=== Diseases and parasites ===
Black-backed jackals can carry diseases such as rabies, canine parvovirus, canine distemper, canine adenovirus, Ehrlichia canis, and African horse sickness. Jackals in Etosha National Park may carry anthrax. Black-backed jackals are major rabies vectors, and have been associated with epidemics, which appear to cycle every 4–8 years. A 2016 rabies outbreak in South Africa confirmed the black-backed jackal's role in sustaining and spreading rabies independently of domestic dogs or other species. Their wide-ranging behavior and interaction with both wildlife and human environments complicate control measures. Jackals in Zimbabwe are able to maintain rabies independently of other species. Although oral vaccinations are effective in jackals, the long-term control of rabies continues to be a problem in areas where stray dogs are not given the same immunisation.

Black-backed jackals may also carry trematodes such as Athesmia, cestodes such as Dipylidium caninum, Echinococcus granulosus, Joyeuxialla echinorhyncoides, J. pasqualei, Mesocestoides lineatus, Taenia erythraea, T. hydatigena, T. jackhalsi, T. multiceps, T. pungutchui, and T. serialis. Nematodes carried by black-backed jackals include Ancylostoma braziliense, A. caninum, A. martinaglia, A. somaliense, A. tubaeforme, and Physaloptera praeputialis, and protozoans such as Babesia canis, Ehrlichia canis, Hepatozoon canis, Rickettsia canis, Sarcocytis spp., Toxoplasma gondii, and Trypanosoma congolense. Mites may cause sarcoptic mange. Tick species include Amblyomma hebraeum, A. marmoreum, A. nymphs, A. variegatum, Boophilus decoloratus, Haemaphysalis leachii, H. silacea, H. spinulosa, Hyelomma spp., Ixodes pilosus, I. rubicundus, Rhipicephalus appendiculatus, R. evertsi, R. sanguineus, and R. simus. Flea species include Ctenocephalides cornatus, Echidnophaga gallinacea, and Synosternus caffer.

== Threats ==
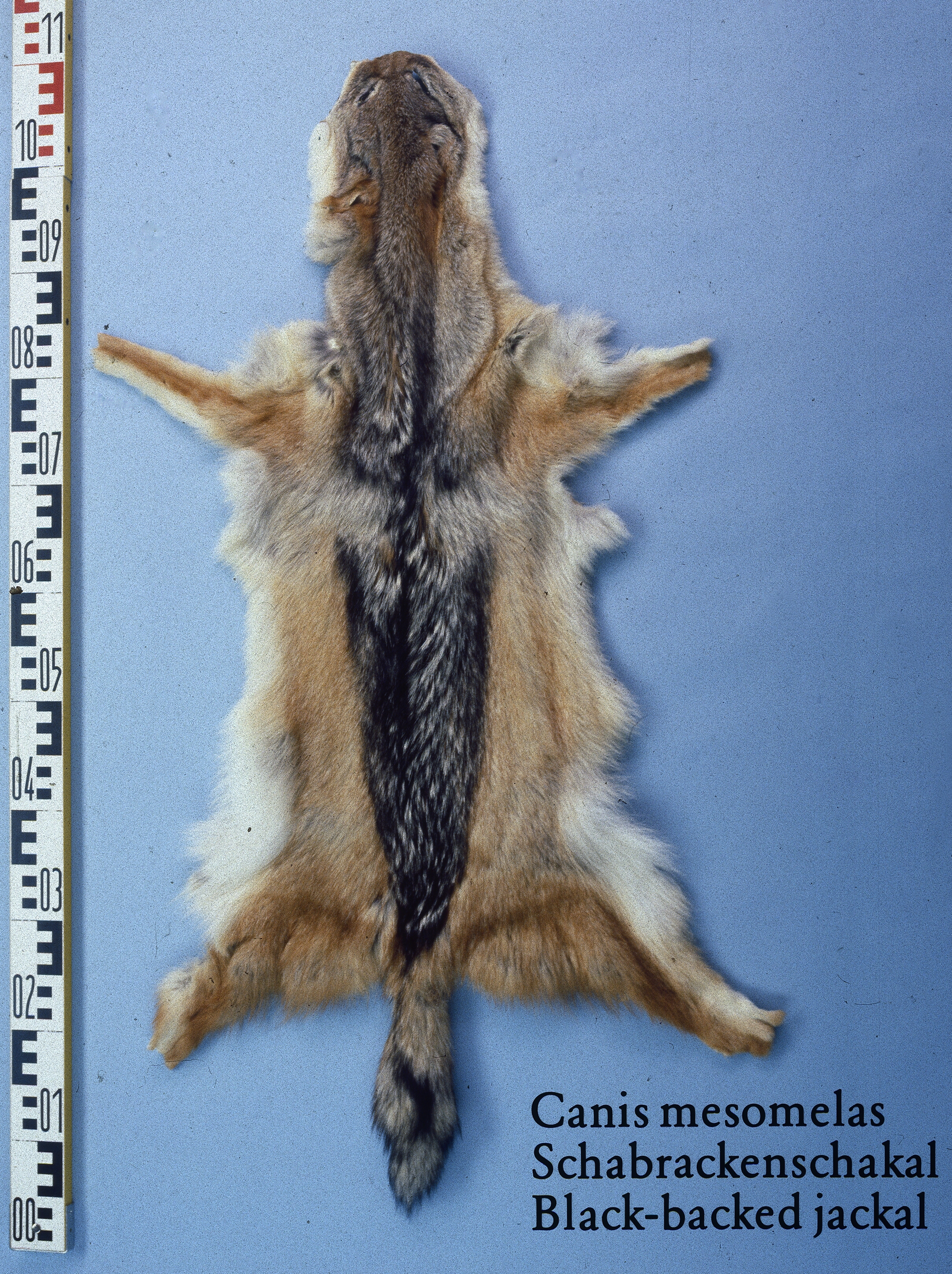
Black-backed jackal pelt

Due to livestock losses to jackals, many hunting clubs were opened in South Africa in the 1850s. Black-backed jackals have never been successfully eradicated in hunting areas, despite strenuous attempts to do so with dogs, poison, and gas. Black-backed jackal coursing was first introduced to the Cape Colony in the 1820s by Lord Charles Somerset, who as an avid fox hunter, sought a more effective method of managing jackal populations, as shooting proved ineffective. Coursing jackals also became a popular pastime in the Boer Republics. In the western Cape in the early 20th century, dogs bred by crossing foxhounds, lurchers, and borzoi were used.

Spring traps with metal jaws were also effective, though poisoning by strychnine became more common by the late 19th century. Strychnine poisoning was initially problematic, as the solution had a bitter taste, and could only work if swallowed. Consequently, many jackals learned to regurgitate poisoned baits, thus inciting wildlife managers to use the less detectable crystal strychnine rather than liquid. The poison was usually placed within sheep carcasses or in balls of fat, with great care being taken to avoid leaving any human scent on them. Black-backed jackals were not a popular quarry in the 19th century, and are rarely mentioned in hunter's literature. By the turn of the century, jackals became increasingly popular quarry as they encroached upon human habitations after sheep farming and veld burning diminished their natural food sources. Although poisoning had been effective in the late 19th century, its success rate in eliminating jackals waned in the 20th century, as jackals seemed to be learning to distinguish poisoned foods.

The Tswana people often made hats and cloaks out of black-backed jackal skins. Between 1914 and 1917, 282,134 jackal pelts (nearly 50,000 a year) were produced in South Africa. Demand for pelts grew during the First World War, and were primarily sold in Cape Town and Port Elizabeth. Jackals in their winter fur were in great demand, though animals killed by poison were less valued, as their fur would shed.

== In folklore ==
Black-backed jackals feature prominently in the folklore of the Khoikhoi, where it is often paired with the lion, whom it frequently outsmarts or betrays with its superior intelligence. One story explains that the black-backed jackal gained its dark saddle when it offered to carry the Sun on its back. An alternative account comes from the ǃKung people, whose folklore tells that the jackal received the burn on its back as a punishment for its scavenging habits. According to an ancient Ethiopian folktale, jackals and man first became enemies shortly before the Great Flood, when Noah initially refused to allow jackals into Noah's Ark, thinking they were unworthy of being saved, until being commanded by God to do so. In modern conservation outreach across southern Africa, the black-backed jackal continues to feature in storytelling as a clever survivor, helping foster local empathy toward native species.
