= Ancylostoma pluridentatum =

Scientific classification
- Domain: Eukaryota
- Kingdom: Animalia
- Phylum: Nematoda
- Class: Chromadorea
- Order: Rhabditida
- Family: Ancylostomatidae
- Genus: Ancylostoma
- Species: A. pluridentatum

Binomial name
- Ancylostoma pluridentatum (Alessandrini, 1905)

Species of roundworm

Ancylostoma pluridentatum is a species of parasitic hookworm that infects wild species of cats. This hookworm is found in the tropical and subtropical parts of the Western Hemisphere.
