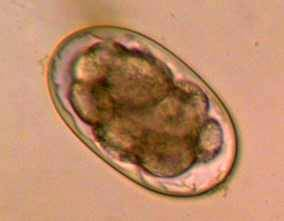
- Egg of Ancylostoma sp.

Scientific classification
- Domain: Eukaryota
- Kingdom: Animalia
- Phylum: Nematoda
- Class: Chromadorea
- Order: Rhabditida
- Family: Ancylostomatidae
- Genus: Ancylostoma; Dubini, 1843

= Ancylostoma =

Genus of roundworms

Ancylostoma is a genus of nematodes that includes some species of hookworms.

Species include:

Ancylostoma braziliense, commonly infects cats, popularly known in Brazil as bicho-geográfico
Ancylostoma caninum, commonly infects dogs
Ancylostoma ceylanicum
Ancylostoma duodenale
Ancylostoma pluridentatum, commonly infects sylvatic cats
Ancylostoma tubaeforme, infects cats along with other hosts

== See also ==
- Ancylostomiasis
- List of parasites (human)
