= Monodontus =

Scientific classification
- Domain: Eukaryota
- Kingdom: Animalia
- Phylum: Nematoda
- Class: Chromadorea
- Order: Rhabditida
- Family: Ancylostomatidae
- Genus: Monodontus; Molin, 1861

Species
- See text

Genus of roundworms

Monodontus is a genus of parasitic nematodes in the subfamily Bunostominae of family Ancylostomatidae. Most of its species occur in rodents and suids, but Monodontus louisianensis is from the white-tailed deer (Odocoileus virginianus) and Monodontus giraffae from the giraffe (Giraffa camelopardalis). An unspecified Monodontus has been recorded from the marsh rice rat (Oryzomys palustris) in Florida.

== See also ==
- List of parasites of the marsh rice rat
