= SongBird Survival =

United Kingdom organization

- Abbreviation: SBS
- Formation: 2001
- Legal status: Charitable Company
- Purpose: To improve, sustain or halt the decline of song and other small bird populations across the British Isles
- Headquarters: UK
- Website: songbird-survival.org.uk

SongBird Survival (SBS) is an independent, UK-wide, environmental bird charity that funds research into the decline in Britain's songbirds. It is a not-for-profit organisation supported by grants, subscriptions and donations, and a registered charity and company.

== Governance ==
SongBird Survival is a non-profit organisation, constituted as a Charitable Company under the laws of England & Wales. The governing document is the Memorandum and Articles of Association. Under the amended Articles of Association, adopted in March 2023, SongBird Survival is run by a Council of up to 15 persons elected by the membership. Council members are elected for a 3-year term, renewable for a maximum of 3 terms.

== History ==
Formed in 1996 as Songbird Survival Action Group, SongBird Survival was registered as a limited company on 26 September 2000. Shortly afterwards, in 2001, the organisation achieved charitable status. In 2006, SBS merged with the Scottish charity Save our Songbirds, founded in 1998 by John Baillie-Hamilton, 13th Earl of Haddington. In 2017 SongBird Survival launched the national awareness day: National Robin Day

== Aims ==
SongBird Survival's objective is to improve, protect and preserve the population of song and other small birds for the benefit of national biodiversity and the public. It aims to achieve this by commissioning and funding scientific research, supporting the conservation and restoration or habitats, through public education and advocacy where changes in the law may be deemed necessary to protect songbirds.

== Research ==
SongBird Survival funds scientific research into the reasons why songbird numbers are declining in the UK. By doing so, the charity aims to advance the science of ornithology, and in particular the study of song and other small birds, as well as contribute to the national evidence base by researching areas where scientific evidence is currently sparse, inadequate or lacking.

SongBird Survival commissions research to add to the evidence base and identify the drivers behind continued songbird declines. Its research to date has encompassed a range of issues, spanning countryside management, population ecology, complex predator–prey dynamics, pesticides, and predator control, including bringing together previously unpublished research conducted at farms across Britain.

Date	Project	Partner(s)	Outputs
2025	High prevalence of veterinary drugs in bird's nests	University of Sussex	Published in Science of the Total Environment.
2023–Ongoing	Factors influencing butterfly and bumblebee richness and abundance in gardens	University of Sussex	Published in Science of the Total Environment.
2020–Present	Understanding pesticide use and how it may affect UK songbirds	University of Sussex	Published in PeerJ. Published in University of Sussex. Published in University of Sussex.
2017	Cats, cat owners and predation - identifying means of mitigating any negative impacts of cat predation of wildlife	University of Exeter	Published in Applied Animal Behaviour Science (2022). Published in Current Biology 2021. Published in Mammal Review 2020. Published in Frontiers in Ecology and the Environment 2020. Published in Trends in Ecology and Evolution 2020. Published in People and Nature 2019.
2014	The Keith Duckworth Project - Improving the conservation value of urban areas for garden birds	University of Reading	Published in Ibis (journal) (2016). Published in Journal of Ornithology 2017, 1–15.
2014	Corvid population ecology and its effect on songbird predation	University of Exeter, Game & Wildlife Conservation Trust	Published in European Journal of Wildlife Research (2019), 50, 9 – 11. Published in Wildlife Biology 2017, 8.
2011	Corvid Research Project - evaluation of the impact of growing numbers of corvids on the productivity of UK farmland songbird population	Game & Wildlife Conservation Trust	Awaiting publication
2010	Farm and woodland bird declines and the recolonisation of Britain by sparrowhawks	Dr. Christopher Bell	Awaiting review and publication
2010	Comprehensive review of all predation research carried out in the UK to date	Centre for Agri-Environmental Research (CAER) University of Reading	Published in Methods in Ecology and Evolution 2010, 1, 300–310
2007	Correlative analysis of long term data sets seeking negative associations between predator and prey species	British Trust for Ornithology; Centre for Research into Ecological and Environmental Modelling (CREEM) University of St Andrews	Published in the Journal of Applied Ecology 2010,
2006	A review of the impact of mammalian predators on farm songbird population dynamics	Professor Roy Brown, University of London	Published 2006 (without peer review)
2003–Present	Long-term farmland study monitoring the effects of environmental stewardship on breeding bird populations	Blackmoor Farm	Study concluded

== Campaigns ==
SongBird Survival aims to provide information and guidance to the public on how they can take action to preserve and protect songbirds. In 2022 their #FriendsNot Food campaign aimed to provide practical solutions to reduce the impact of cats hunting based on the findings of the University of Exeter Research Study.

In 2024, SongBird Survival launched the "Get EduCATed campaign aiming to Increase awareness among cat owners of songbird decline and show scientifically proven ways that they can take action to mitigate the impact of their cats.

SongBird Survival is calling for a review of the environmental risk assessment of companion animal medication for flea and tick treatments, building on research findings at University of Sussex.

The SongBird Survival Garden at RHS Chelsea Flower Show 2025 raises awareness of the crisis affecting songbirds and shows how actions in gardens can help to protect them.
