= Ancylostoma ceylanicum =

Scientific classification
- Kingdom: Animalia
- Phylum: Nematoda
- Class: Chromadorea
- Order: Rhabditida
- Family: Ancylostomatidae
- Genus: Ancylostoma
- Species: A. ceylanicum

Binomial name
- Ancylostoma ceylanicum Looss 1911

Species of roundworm

Ancylostoma ceylanicum is a parasitic roundworm belonging to the genus Ancylostoma. It is a hookworm both of humans and of other mammals such as dogs, cats, and golden hamsters. It is the only zoonotic hookworm species that is able to produce symptomatic infections in humans, with the majority of cases being in Southeast Asia.

== Discovery and history ==
Since the description of Ancylostoma ceylanicum by Arthur Looss in 1911, and A. braziliense by Gomes de Faria in 1910, the two species were considered synonymous because of their apparent similarities in almost all respects. In 1913, comparison of specimens from human, dog, cat and lion infections in India led to the conclusion that they were definitely identical. In 1915 Gomes de Faria described the anatomical structures and concluded that the two were distinct species. Until 1921 A. ceylanicum was accepted as a valid species. However, in 1922 Gordon made an exhaustive comparison from specimens collected in Brazil, South Africa and India, and he failed to identify any distinction. Other parasitologists also became convinced that the two names were synonymous. In 1951 Biocca made an elaborate study of different hookworms in the collection of London School of Hygiene and Tropical Medicine, the Liverpool School of Tropical Medicine and personal collections. He finally identified the defining characters between the two for classifying them as distinct species, which eventually gained general acceptance.

== Description ==
The adult hookworms are white and about 6–10 mm long. They are generally stouter than A. braziliense. The anterior end is bent dorsally, which gives the body a characteristic "hooked" or J-shaped appearance, hence the common name hookworm. Females have a tapered narrow posterior end, while males have a feathery posterior end owing to their copulatory bursa. Hookworm species are not easily distinguished from the gross appearance. The key diagnostic feature is the appearance of their mouths. Unlike other hookworms, A. ceylanicum has a mouth with cutting plate with a sharp dorsal end that looks like a tooth and a less distinct sharp ventral end.

== Biology ==
The Infective larvae quickly undergo moulting to shed their sheath either upon ingestion by the host or upon burrowing into the host's skin. If ingested, they pass through the stomach into the intestine and attach themselves to the mucosa. If they have burrowed through the skin, they invade the subcutaneous blood vessels, are carried to the lungs, and then move to the intestine via trachea, oesophagus and stomach. In either case, the larvae develop into the final 3rd stage in the intestinal wall. The 4th stage larvae appear in 47 hours after oral infection. The 5th stage immature worms appear 6 days after infection. They reach sexual maturity on and after 2 weeks after infection.

Unlike the hookworms Necator americanus and Ancylostoma duodenale, A. ceylanicum can competently infect and thrive within not only human hosts but other mammalian hosts as well (such as dogs, cats, or golden hamsters). Because it may primarily infect non-human mammals, and infect humans only opportunistically when its mammalian hosts are in close contact with people, A. ceylanicum is termed a zoonotic hookworm. This same trait makes A. ceylanicum a uniquely useful hookworm, since it can be studied in the laboratory while infecting golden hamsters, unlike most or all strains of N. americanus or A. duodenale, and thus can also be used as a test organism for possible drugs or vaccines aimed at preventing human infections.

Ancylostoma ceylanicum attaches itself to capillary beds in the small intestine of a host where it feeds on blood and causes anaemia. In hamsters anaemia is most severe between the 13th and 60th days of infection, and is accompanied by significant loss in body weight. Experimental infection of hamsters shows increased antibodies, peripheral cellular immune suppression, which is characterized by a reduction in the total white blood cell count, neutropenia and lymphopenia. The most serious effects are manifested in children and women of childbearing age displaying chronic intestinal blood loss which may result in iron deficiency, anaemia and hypoalbuminemia. The long-term effects include impaired physical, intellectual and cognitive development of children, increased mortality in pregnant women and their infants and reduced physical capacity.

== Epidemiology ==
Ancylostoma ceylanicum infection is found in Cambodia, Malaysia, The Solomon Islands, Australia, Thailand, India, Sri Lanka, South Africa, Madagascar, Indonesia, Fiji Islands and Taiwan.

== Diagnosis ==
Infection is detectable from a stool sample of the host. Eggs can be microscopically analysed. However, there is no clear-cut distinction between different hookworms due to their physical similarity, and species are often mistaken for one another. The Kato-Katz method and molecular techniques such as polymerase chain reaction (PCR) can be used to distinguish hookworm species, but are not always effective at doing so. Sequencing of ribosomal RNA gene is often reliable but time consuming. A PCR coupled with high resolution melting-curve (HRM) was found to be highly sensitive in discriminating A. ceylanicum from other hookworms.

== Treatment ==
Ivermectin is highly effective even at the low dose of 100 μg per kg, and pyrantel is also effective at 25–50 mg per kg. Benzimidazoles such as mebendazole, parbendazole and thiabendazole are also highly effective.

== Genome ==
A draft assembly of the genome of Ancylostoma ceylanicum has been sequenced and analyzed. It comprises 313 Mb, estimated to be 95% of the full genome, with transcriptomic data throughout infection showing expression of 30,738 predicted protein-coding genes. These include genes encoding three gene families upregulated during successive stages of infection: Activation-associated Secreted Protein Related (ASPRs), Secreted L4 Proteins (SL4Ps), and Secreted Clade V proteins (SCVPs). The genes of A. ceylanicum also include predicted targets for drugs and vaccines.
