= Hookworm =

Parasitic roundworm

Hookworms are intestinal, blood-feeding, parasitic roundworms that cause types of infection known as helminthiases. Hookworm infection is found in many parts of the world, and is common in areas with poor access to adequate water, sanitation, and hygiene. In humans, infections are caused by two main species of roundworm, belonging to the genera Ancylostoma and Necator. In other animals the main parasites are species of Ancylostoma. Hookworm is closely associated with poverty because it is most often found in impoverished areas, and its symptoms promote poverty through the educational and health effects it has on children. It is the leading cause of anemia and undernutrition in developing countries, while being one of the most commonly occurring diseases among poor people. Hookworm thrives in areas where rainfall is sufficient and keeps the soil from drying out, and where temperatures are higher, making rural, coastal areas prime conditions for the parasite to breed.

== Species ==
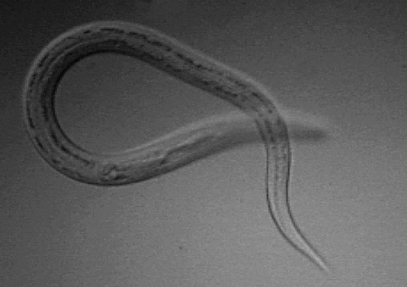
Infective N. americanus larva

The two most common types of hookworm that infect humans are Ancylostoma duodenale and Necator americanus.

Hookworm species that are known to infect domestic cats are Ancylostoma braziliense and Ancylostoma tubaeforme. Wild cats are infected by Ancylostoma pluridentatum.

Dogs are commonly infected by Ancylostoma caninum, but may also be infected by Uncinaria stenocephala and Ancylostoma braziliense.

In Asia, Ancylostoma ceylanicum is endemic among dogs and cats and infects humans.

Cattle are infected by Bunostomum phlebotomum.

At least 68 species have been described in wild mammals.

== Characteristics ==
The two species that commonly infect humans have a similar morphology. A. duodenale worms are pale grey or slightly pink. The head is bent a little in relation to the rest of the body, forming a hook shape – hence the name. The hook is at the front end of the body. They have well-developed mouths with two pairs of teeth. Males measure approximately 10 by 0.5 mm, and females are often longer and stouter. Males also have a prominent copulatory bursa posteriorly.

N. americanus is generally smaller than A. duodenale, with males usually being 5 to 9 mm long and females about 10 mm long. Instead of the two pairs of teeth in A. duodenale, N. americanus has a pair of cutting plates in the buccal capsule. Also, the hook is much more defined in Necator americanus.

=== Life cycle ===
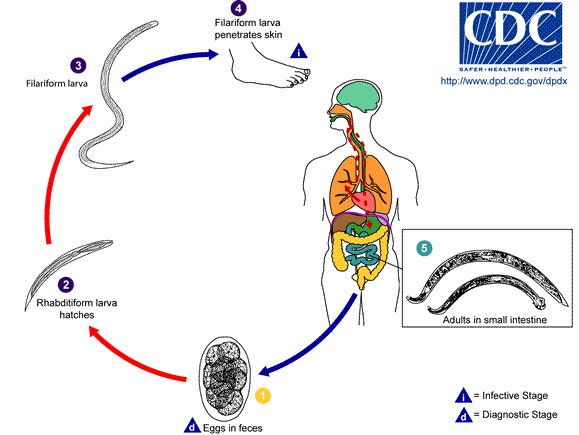
Hookworm life cycle

The host is infected by the larvae, not by the eggs, and the usual route is through the skin. Hookworm larvae need warm, moist soil, above 18 °C, in order to hatch. They will die if exposed to direct sunlight or if they become dried out. Necator larvae can survive at higher temperatures than Ancylostoma larvae.

First-stage larvae (L1) are non-infective. Once they are hatched in the deposited feces, they feed on it, and then feed on soil microorganisms until they moult into second stage larvae (L2). First- and second-stage larvae are in the rhabditiform stage. After feeding for seven days or so, they will moult into third-stage larvae (L3) known as the filariform stage, which is the non-feeding, infective stage. Filariform larvae can survive for up to two weeks. They are extremely motile and will move onto higher ground to improve their chances of finding a host.

Necator americanus larvae can only infect through penetrating skin, but A. duodenale can also infect orally. A common route of passage for the larvae is the skin of barefoot walkers. Once the larvae have entered the host, they travel in the circulatory system to the lungs, where they leave the venules and enter the alveoli. They then travel up the trachea, are coughed up, swallowed and end up in the small intestine. In the small intestine, the larvae moult into stage four (L4) and subsequently into the adult worm. It takes about a week for the larvae to reach the gastrointestinal tract and a total of five to nine weeks from larval skin penetration for eggs to be passed in stool, indicating that the parasite has reached maturity in the intestine and mated.

Necator americanus can cause a prolonged infection lasting from one to five years, with many worms dying in the first year or two. Some worms, though, have been recorded as living for fifteen years or more. In comparison, Ancylostoma duodenale worms are short-lived, lasting for around six months. However, larvae can remain dormant in tissue stores and be recruited over many years to replace the worms that die.

The worms mate inside the host, in which the females also lay their eggs, to be passed out in the host's feces into the environment to start the cycle again. N. americanus can lay between nine and ten thousand eggs per day, and A. duodenale between twenty-five and thirty thousand per day. The eggs of the two species are indistinguishable.

Worms need five to seven weeks to reach maturity, and symptoms of infection can therefore appear before eggs are found in the feces, making the diagnosis of hookworm infection difficult.

== Diagnosis ==
Signs and symptoms of hookworm infection vary by host and hookworm species. In humans, the first sign of infection is itching and skin rash. Humans with light infections may show no symptoms, but humans with heavy infections may have abdominal pain, diarrhea, loss of appetite, weight loss, fatigue and anemia. Children's physical and cognitive growth may be affected.

Dogs and cats may experience dermatitis, enteritis, and intestinal blood loss. Dogs may additionally experience anemia, hemorrhagic diarrhea, anorexia and dehydration.

Cattle may experience skin lesions, anemia, and rapid weight loss.

Diagnosis for many forms of hookworm infections is confirmed through fecal analysis to identify hookworm eggs. In animals, fecal floatation is used to detect hookworm eggs.

== Treatment ==
Treatment for hookworm infections depends on the species of hookworm and the species of the infected host. In humans, treatment is by anthelminthic medications, such as albendazole and mebendazole. Treatment in animals can be done with a variety of anthelminthics. A high-protein diet, supplemental iron, or a blood transfusion may also be necessary. Levamisole and pyrantel pamoate are also used to treat hookworm anemia and hookworm disease.

== Potential benefits ==
There has been some recent anecdotal evidence, that helminthic therapy, deliberate self-infection by worms such as the hookworm, has the potential to substantially mitigate allergies, endocrine disorders, and human autoimmune diseases. These potential benefits align with hypotheses of parasitologists Judith Allen and Rick Maizels and environmental geographer Jamie Lorimer that humans and hookworms co-evolved together and that hookworms take on a role as mutualists within the human microbiome in some contexts.

== Prevention ==
Hookworm infection is treatable and has been locally eradicated in many areas. Successful eradication programs first killed the parasites in victims, then stressed the importance of not walking barefoot in areas where people often defecate. It was important to build outhouses near schools. Large training efforts funded by the Rockefeller Foundation showed state health departments how to eradicate the disease in the American South during the 1910s.

== Hookworm in the United States ==
While thought to be eradicated around the 1960s, it is possible that hookworm persists in certain areas in the United States. Lowndes County, Alabama was the subject of various studies on the prevalence and transmission of hookworm as it relates to sanitation issues that the county experienced. Catherine Coleman Flowers is the figure most closely associated with these studies and efforts to raise awareness of the sanitation problems that face Lowndes. Being one of the poorest counties in the United States with 31.4% of people living below the poverty line, one of the major sanitation issues facing the county is that many residents do not have an adequate sewage system. The study led by the Baylor College of Medicine noted that roughly three-fourths of the study participants had reported raw sewage flowing back into their homes, increasing the likelihood of their home becoming contaminated.

The study in Lowndes had a small sample size of 55 subjects, from 24 households. The results from the screening of hookworm found that over one-third, 19 out of 55, people testing positive by qPCR, demonstrating a stronger correlation to poverty than to the tropics. An important organization involved is the Alabama Center for Rural Enterprise (ACRE), which works to address poverty and economic development, and has stated that there continues to be a lack of adequate sewage systems, and this increases exposure to open sewage. Surveys conducted before the testing identified subjects that had traveled abroad to exclude them from the study, making the infection site more likely to be Alabama. A subsequent larger study of 777 children in Alabama's Black Belt (132 from Lowndes) by the University of Alabama at Birmingham and the University of North Carolina at Chapel Hill with blinded, independent sample analyses by the CDC using both standard diagnostic measures as well as qPCR and dPCR identified no cases of hookworm but did identify some other potential sanitation-related pathogens. To date, no cases of hookworm have been identified in Alabama in the modern era via the standard diagnostic measure of identifying hookworm eggs in feces.
