= Ancylostoma tubaeforme =

Scientific classification
- Kingdom: Animalia
- Phylum: Nematoda
- Class: Chromadorea
- Order: Rhabditida
- Family: Ancylostomatidae
- Genus: Ancylostoma
- Species: A. tubaeforme

Binomial name
- Ancylostoma tubaeforme (Zeder, 1800)

Species of roundworm

Ancylostoma tubaeforme is a hookworm that infects cats worldwide. Infection can occur through penetration of the skin, ingestion of infected hosts, such as birds, or by directly consuming the organism. Ancylostoma tubaeforme along with Ancylostoma braziliense are the two most common hookworms to infect cats, causing anemia and compromising the immune system.

== Morphology ==
The body of an adult A. tubaeforme is between 7 and 12 millimeters long.

== Signs ==
Ancylostoma tubaeforme infection may lead to dermatitis, anemia, weight loss, and pulmonary lesions.

== Life cycle ==
Ancylostoma tubaeforme larvae may infect a host through oral ingestion or through skin lesions.

Larvae ingested by the host pass through the esophagus into the stomach. From there, they burrow into the lining of the stomach and duodenum, and develop into their adult form. The adult hookworms then burrow back into the lining of the stomach and release their ova into the gastrointestinal tract.

Larvae that infect a host by penetrating the skin migrate to the stomach by first traveling through the lungs, up the trachea, and down the esophagus. From there, the larvae develop into adult hookworms, burrow back into the stomach lining, and release their ova into the gastrointestinal tract.

The prepatent period, the time between infection and when larvae can be detected, is 22–25 days.

== Diagnosis ==
Diagnosis of A. tubaeforme infection is done through routine fecal flotation.

== Treatment ==
Infections are typically treated with oral anthelmintics such as fenbendazole, or topical treatments such as selamectin.

== See also ==
- Feline zoonosis
