= Uncinaria stenocephala =

Scientific classification
- Kingdom: Animalia
- Phylum: Nematoda
- Class: Chromadorea
- Order: Rhabditida
- Family: Ancylostomatidae
- Genus: Uncinaria
- Species: U. stenocephala

Binomial name
- Uncinaria stenocephala (Railliet, 1884)

Species of roundworm

Uncinaria stenocephala is a nematode that parasitizes dogs, cats, and foxes, as well as humans. It is rare to find in cats in the United States. U. stenocephala is the most common canine hookworm in cooler regions, such as Canada and the northern regions of the US, where it can be found primarily in foxes (40%). U. stenocephala is also one of the most common hookworms in the UK, called the northern hookworm, but it has a rather low prevalence. U. stenocephala is also considered to be zoonotic, because it lives in animals, but can be transmitted to humans.

== Lifecycle ==
The host ingests an infective third-stage larva. The larva matures to the adult in the small intestine. Eggs are laid in the small intestine and pass out with the feces. The prepatent period is about 15 to 17 days. The eggs hatch in the soil and the larvae molt twice to reach the infective third stage. Infections worsen and amplify when dogs that are regularly kept outside are not routinely dewormed.

Adult worms may live for 4 to 24 months in the small intestine. Dog and cat hookworms range in size from 10 to 20 mm by 0.4 to 0.5 mm and the eggs are 71 to 93 μm by 35 to 58 μm. A high number of eggs are laid per female; U. stenocephala was measured at over 5,000 eggs.

Adult parasites are most often found in their hosts' small intestine. A second type of infection occurs with transdermal larval infection into the dog's skin, usually made possible by warm weather and humidity, which allows the larvae to grow in the environment. These transdermal infections are not very significant in U. stenocephala because about 2.3 ± 1.3% of infective larvae actually reach the small intestine to finish its lifecycle.

== Diagnosis ==
Diagnostic stage:

- Eggs are found in fecal flotation (diagnostic).
- Eggs measure 75 um long by 45 um wide.

Clinical signs:

- U. stenocephala ingests plasma protein rather than whole blood, so the loss of nutrients is evident.
- All hookworms suck blood; they are capable of removing 0.1 ml of blood per worm, per 24-hour period.
- Light infections are asymptomatic.
- Infected pups may present with pale mucous membranes and anemia, ill thrift, failure to gain weight, poor hair coat, dehydration, and dark, tarry diarrhea (melena). Puppies harboring many worms develop an acute normocytic, normochromic anemia followed by hypochromic, microcytic anemia due to iron deficiency. Without immediate intervention, these animals may die of the infection. Those that survive may continue as "poor doers" with chronic anemia.

U. stenocephala is considered a zoonotic hookworm and can cause a few different diseases in humans, including cutaneous larva migrans. Humans become infected when the larvae penetrate unprotected skin due to contaminated animal feces in the environment.

== Treatment and prevention ==
Effective treatment of U. stenocephala includes proper medical treatment and the proper choice of anthelmintic (febantel, febantel/pyrantel embonate, fenbendazole, ivermectin, mebendazole, pyrantel pamoate). Infected animals are recommended to have their feces examined three weeks after treatment is complete. Heartworm prevention products that include ivermectin/pyrantal/praziquantel or Moxidectin are good at controlling U. stenocephala in dogs.
