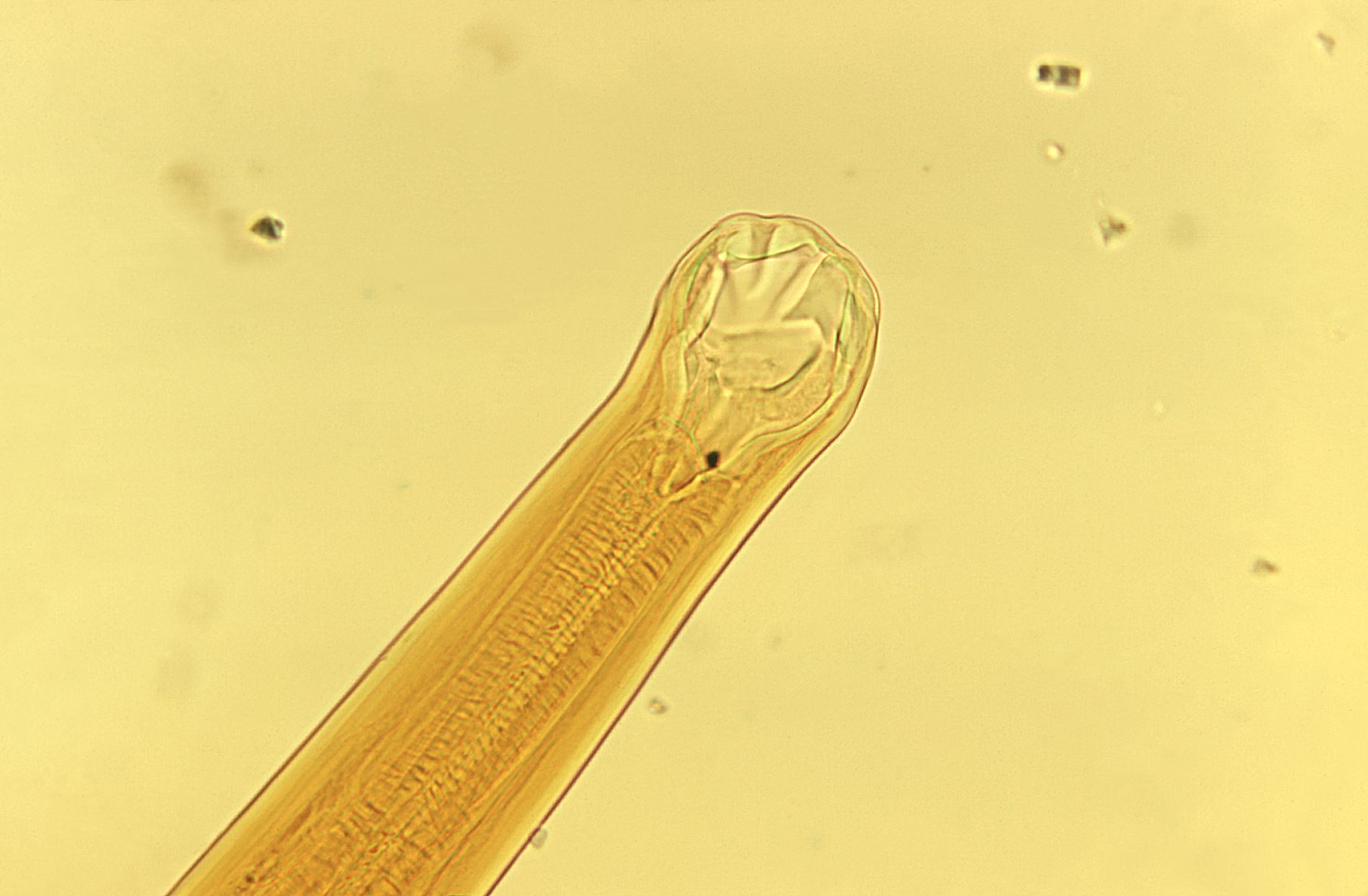
- Ancylostoma braziliense, mouth parts

Scientific classification
- Kingdom: Animalia
- Phylum: Nematoda
- Class: Chromadorea
- Order: Rhabditida
- Family: Ancylostomatidae
- Genus: Ancylostoma
- Species: A. braziliense

Binomial name
- Ancylostoma braziliense Gomes de Faria 1910

= Ancylostoma braziliense =

Species of worm

Ancylostoma braziliense is a species of hookworm belonging to the genus Ancylostoma. It is an intestinal parasite of domestic cats and dogs. Severe infection is often fatal to these pets, especially in puppies and kittens. The infection is particularly endemic in the southern United States. It is most often confused with the zoonotic hookworm species Ancylostoma ceylanicum because of their uncanny resemblance.

Ancylostoma braziliense larvae can cause accidental infection in humans called cutaneous larval migration or creeping eruption, which produces severe itching in the skin. It is the most common skin infection in tropical region, particularly along the beaches of the Caribbean.

== Discovery and history ==
When A. braziliense was described by Gomes de Faria in 1910, and A. ceylanicum by Arthur Looss in 1911, the two species were regarded as synonymous because of their apparent similarities in almost all respect. Especially in 1913, comparison of specimens from human, dog, cat and lion infections in India led to the conclusion that they were definitely of the same species. In 1915 Gomes de Faria realised that the two were distinct species based on their anatomical structures. Till 1921 the two hookworms were accepted as a two valid species. However, in 1922 Gordon made an exhaustive comparison from specimens collected in Brazil, South Africa and India, and his conclusion was that there were no significant distinction. Other parasitologists were also convinced of this so that the two names were again considered synonymous. In 1951 Biocca made an elaborate study on different hookworms in the collection of London School of Hygiene and Tropical Medicine, the Liverpool School of Tropical Medicine and personal collections. He finally identified the defining characters between the two for classifying them as distinct species, which eventually gained general acceptance.

== Distribution ==
A. braziliense is endemic in the southern United States. It is also found in a number of subtropical regions around the world, including Central and South America, South Africa, and southern Asia. In southern Asia, infection is confined to Indonesia, Borneo, and Malaysia.

== Physical description ==
Like many other worms, the female worm is larger than the male. Also, the females are more difficult to distinguish because the mouth's tooth sizes appear very similar among the various species of Ancylostoma. Male worms, however, have trilobed tails with rays present on the copulatory bursa. These bursal rays aid in distinguishing the different species of Ancylostoma.

== Life cycle ==
Ancylostoma braziliense eggs are passed into the environment through the feces of cats and dogs. The eggs incubate on warm, moist soil, where they hatch into larvae. The infective juvenile penetrate the skin of the host. At this stage, the larvae are present in the epidermis, hair follicles, and glands of the skin, sometimes extending to sebaceous glands where they form coils. Then they migrate to the heart and lung by moving along the blood circulation. In the lungs, the juveniles enter the alveoli and are propelled by cilia up the respiratory tract. From this, the host swallow them and deposit them in the small intestine. They get attached to the intestinal mucosa via the buccal capsule. Here they undergo two successive molts to become sexually mature individuals.

== Etymology ==
Etymology: Ancylo = curved + stoma = mouth; braziliense for the geographical location where the worms were first found.

== Pathology ==
It can cause "creeping eruption" or "ground itch". It occurs when the larvae from the faeces of cats and dogs accidentally penetrate the human skin, causing severe itching and skin eruption. It is the most common ailment of tropically acquired dermatitis, particularly along the beaches of the Caribbean. However, humans are not the natural definitive hosts, and are therefore a dead-end for the parasites. In humans, the larvae die after few months without further development.

== Symptoms ==
Ancylostoma braziliense is a parasite that infects cats and dogs and occasionally humans. They survive by eating blood from the intestine of cats and dogs, causing anemia. Pale gums and weakness are common signs of anemia. The infected animals also experience significant weight loss, bloody diarrhea, and are not able to grow up to their right size. Other symptoms like skin irritation and itching are also caused by the larvae burrowing into the skin.

== Diagnosis and treatment ==
A. braziliense is difficult to differentiate from other hookworms. Microscopic examination of scatological samples can identify the eggs as they are generally smaller than those of other species.

Most benzimidazoles are effective. Mebendazole, triclabendazole and fenbendazole are commonly used. Ivermectin and pyrantel pamoate are also effective. The combination of ivermectin 6 μg/kg and pyrantel pamoate at 5.0 mg/kg is 100% efficacious against adult worms in dogs. Human infection in one case of cutaneous larva migrans was treated successfully with oral thiabendazole administered at 500 mg in four daily doses for five days.
