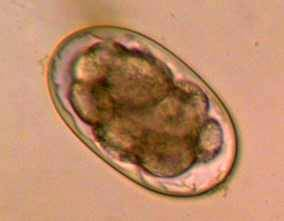
- Egg of Ancylostoma sp.

Scientific classification
- Kingdom: Animalia
- Phylum: Nematoda
- Class: Chromadorea
- Order: Rhabditida
- Superfamily: Ancylostomatoidea
- Family: Ancylostomatidae

= Ancylostomatidae =

Family of roundworms

The Ancylostomatidae are a family of worms that includes the hookworms.

== Genera of Ancylostomatidae ==
- Agriostomum
- Ancylostoma
- Bunostomum
- Cyclodontostomum
- Galonchus
- Monodontus
- Necator
- Uncinaria

== Habit ==
The hookworms, Ancylostoma and Necator, draw a plug of intestinal mucosa into their buccal capsule. The tissue is broken down and blood is rapidly pumped through the intestine of the nematode so that most of it goes undigested.

== Lifecycle ==
The hookworms, Necator americanus and Ancylostoma duodenale, hatch as first-stage juveniles within the soil and develop to an infective third-stage juvenile. Infection occurs by direct penetration through the skin of the host. Although the two species differ, they are both susceptible to environmental hazards such as desiccation. This limits their distribution to warm, wet climates such as the tropics. The third-stage juvenile is also the infective stage of trichostrongyle nematodes, including those infecting sheep and cattle. Both the first-stage juvenile within the egg and the ensheathed infective juvenile are resistant to desiccation, chemicals, and low temperatures and the infective juvenile can survive on pasture for several months before infecting a host.

== Control ==
The most appropriate control measures for hookworms and ascariasis are to concentrate chemotherapy on heavily infected individuals (taking advantage of overdispersion) and to improve sanitation to reduce the rate of transmission.
