= Necator =

Necator may refer to:

- Necator (fungus), a genus of fungus in the family Corticiaceae
- Necator (nematode), a genus of nematodes in the family Ancylostomatidae
