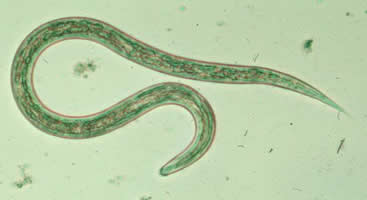
- Photomicrograph of larva

Scientific classification
- Kingdom: Animalia
- Phylum: Nematoda
- Class: Chromadorea
- Order: Rhabditida
- Family: Ancylostomatidae
- Genus: Ancylostoma
- Species: A. duodenale

Binomial name
- Ancylostoma duodenale (Dubini, 1843)

Synonyms
- Agchylostoma duodenale Dubini, 1843

= Ancylostoma duodenale =

Species of the roundworm genus Ancylostoma

Ancylostoma duodenale is a species of the roundworm genus Ancylostoma. It is a parasitic nematode worm and commonly known as the Old-World hookworm. It lives in the small intestine especially the jejunum of definitive hosts, generally humans, where it is able to mate and mature. Ancylostoma duodenale and Necator americanus are the two human hookworm species that are normally discussed together as the cause of hookworm infection. They are dioecious. Ancylostoma duodenale is abundant throughout the world, including Southern Europe, North Africa, India, China, Southeast Asia, some areas in the United States, the Caribbean, and South America.

== Characteristics ==
A. duodenale is small, cylindrical worm, greyish-white in color. It has two ventral plates on the anterior margin of the buccal capsule. Each of them has two large teeth that are fused at their bases. A pair of small teeth can be found in the depths of the buccal capsule. Males are 8–11 mm long with a copulatory bursa at the posterior end. Females are 10–13 mm long, with the vulva located at the posterior end; females can lay 10,000 to 30,000 eggs per day. The average lifespan of a female A. duodenale is one year. There are four larval stages, and the filariform larvae (L3) are sheathed because they retain the cuticle of the prior developmental stage after molting.

== Lifecycle ==
After a filariform "infective" larva penetrates the intact skin – most commonly through the feet – the larva enters the blood circulation. It is then carried to the lungs, breaks into alveoli, ascends the bronchi and trachea, and is coughed up and swallowed back into the small intestine, where it matures. The larva later matures into an adult in the small intestine (jejunum mainly), where they attach to the villi and female worms can lay 25,000 eggs per day. The eggs are released into the feces and reside on soil; when deposited on warm, moist soil, a larva rapidly develops in the egg and hatches after one to two days. This rhabditiform larva moults twice in the soil and becomes a skin-penetrating third-stage infective larva within 5 to 10 days. These infective filariform larvae are able to sense vibrations in the soil, heat, or carbon dioxide, and employ dendritic processes similar to cilia. They use these processes as thermosensory, chemosensory, and mechanosensory receptors to migrate towards a host for infection. The filariform larvae (L3 stage) can then penetrate the exposed skin of another organism and begin a new cycle of infection. A. duodenale can also be transmitted orally, mediated by ingestion of the filariform larvae; it may have paratenic hosts in other mammals, in whom the larvae may survive in muscles. Vertical transmission in people by breastfeeding and by a transplacental route has been reported.

== Epidemiology ==
A. duodenale is prevalent in Southern Europe, North Africa, India, China, Southeast Asia, small areas of United States, the Caribbean islands, and South America. This hookworm is well known in mines because of the consistency in temperature and humidity that provides an ideal habitat for egg and juvenile development. An estimated one billion people are infected with hookworms. Transmission of A. duodenale is by contact of skin with soil contaminated with larvae. The way it enters the human body was understood in the 1880s, after an epidemic of ancylostomiasis among miners working in the hot and humid Gotthard Tunnel (Switzerland).

== Infection ==
A light hookworm infection causes abdominal pain, loss of appetite, and geophagy. Heavy infection causes severe protein deficiency or iron-deficiency anemia. Protein deficiency may lead to dry skin, edema, and abdominal distension from edema (potbelly), while iron-deficiency anemia might result in mental dullness and heart failure. In pregnant women, this parasite is able to infect the fetus and can cause complications such as low birth weight, maternal anemia, and infant mortality.

The eggs of A. duodenale and Necator americanus cannot be distinguished. Larvae cannot be found in stool specimens unless they are left at ambient temperature for a day or more. Education, improved sanitation, and controlled disposal of human feces are important. Wearing shoes in endemic areas can reduce the prevalence of infection, as well. A. duodenale can be treated with albendazole, mebendazole, and benzimidazoles. Pyrantel pamoate is an alternative. In severe cases of anemia, blood transfusion may be necessary.

== Gallery ==
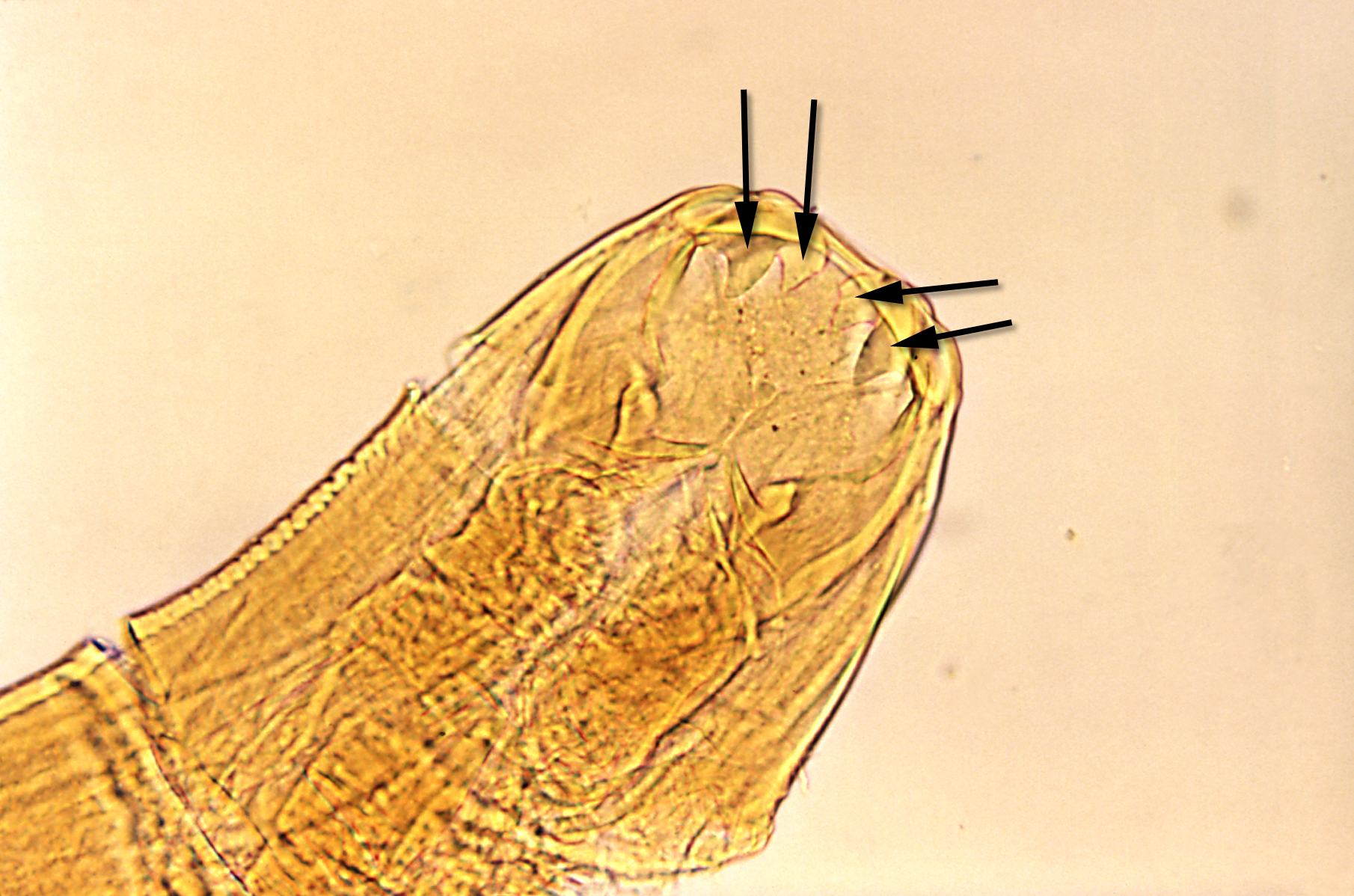
Buccal capsule of adult showing four teeth (arrows) on its ventral wall

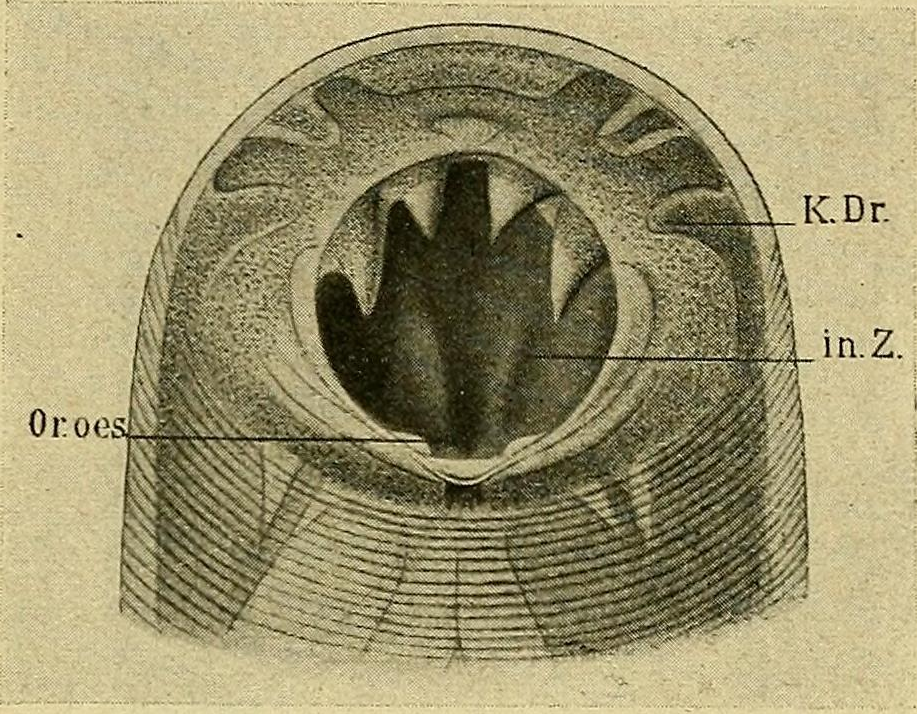
Diagram of adult's head

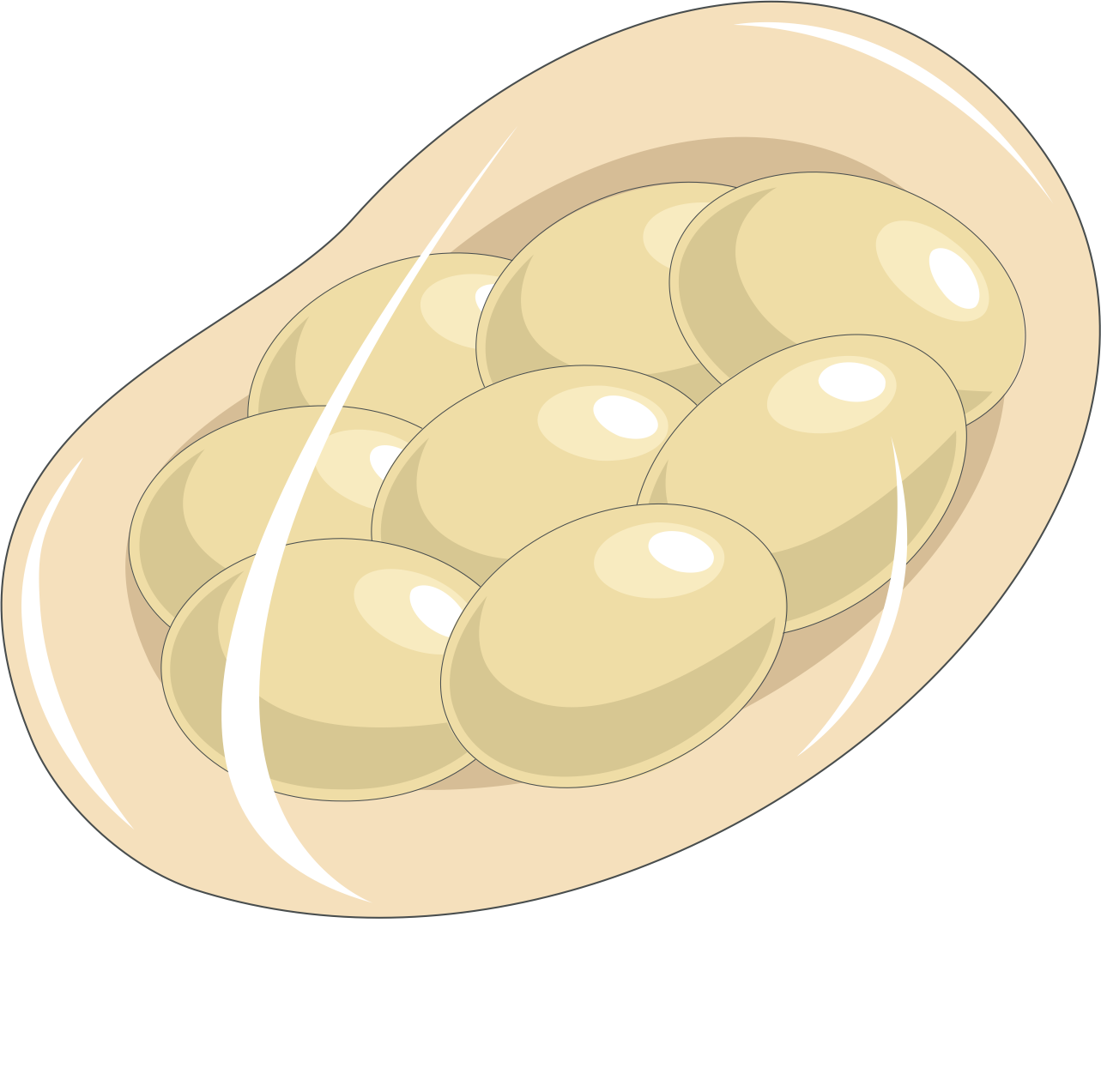
Schematic of thin-shelled egg at eight-cell stage

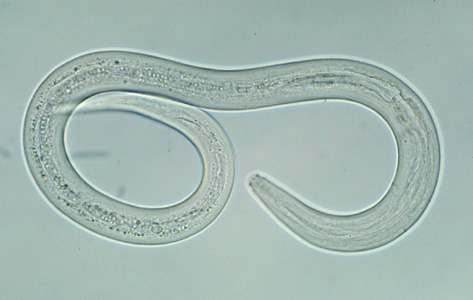
Infective filariform larva

== See also ==
- Necator americanus - another disease-causing hookworm in humans
