= Angelo Dubini =

Italian physician

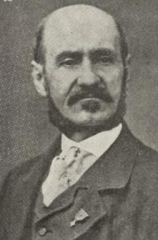
Angelo Dubini

Angelo Dubini (8 December 1813 – 28 March 1902) was an Italian physician born in Milan.

He earned his doctorate from the University of Pavia in 1837 and spent most of his professional career at the Ospedale Maggiore in Milan. In 1865 he became head physician and director of the hospital's dermatology department.

Dubini is remembered for his discovery of an intestinal parasite he named Anchylostoma duodenale. He first noticed the parasite in 1838 during an autopsy of a peasant woman who died of croupous pneumonia. He would rediscover the parasite in the course of other autopsies in ensuing years. In 1843 he published his findings in Annali universali di medicina. The pathogenicity of the parasite was eventually confirmed by way of research of Egyptian chlorosis conducted by Wilhelm Griesinger, Theodor Maximilian Bilharz and Franz Ignaz Pruner, as well as in Otto Eduard Heinrich Wucherer's study of tropical chlorosis (which would probably be called iron deficiency anemia today).

The term "Dubini's disease" is an historical name for the myoclonic form of epidemic encephalitis.

== Published works ==
- Nuovo verme intestinale umano (Agchylostoma duodenale), costituente un sesto genere dei Nematoidei proprii dell’uomo. Annali universali di medicina, Milano, 1843, 106: 5-13.
- Primi cenni sulla corea elettrica. Annali universali di medicina, Milano, 1846, 117: 5-50.
- Entozoografia umana per servire di complemento agli studi d’anatomica patologica. Milano, 1850.
- Dell arte di fare le sezioni cadaveriche. Indices nosologici ordine alphabetico adnotationibus therapeuticis accomodati. Milano, 1859.
