= Nematode dermatitis =

- Specialty: Dermatology

Nematode dermatitis is a cutaneous condition characterized by widespread folliculitis caused by Ancylostoma caninum.

== See also ==
- Skin lesion
