= Hookworm infection =

Disease caused by intestinal parasites

- Other names: Hookworm disease
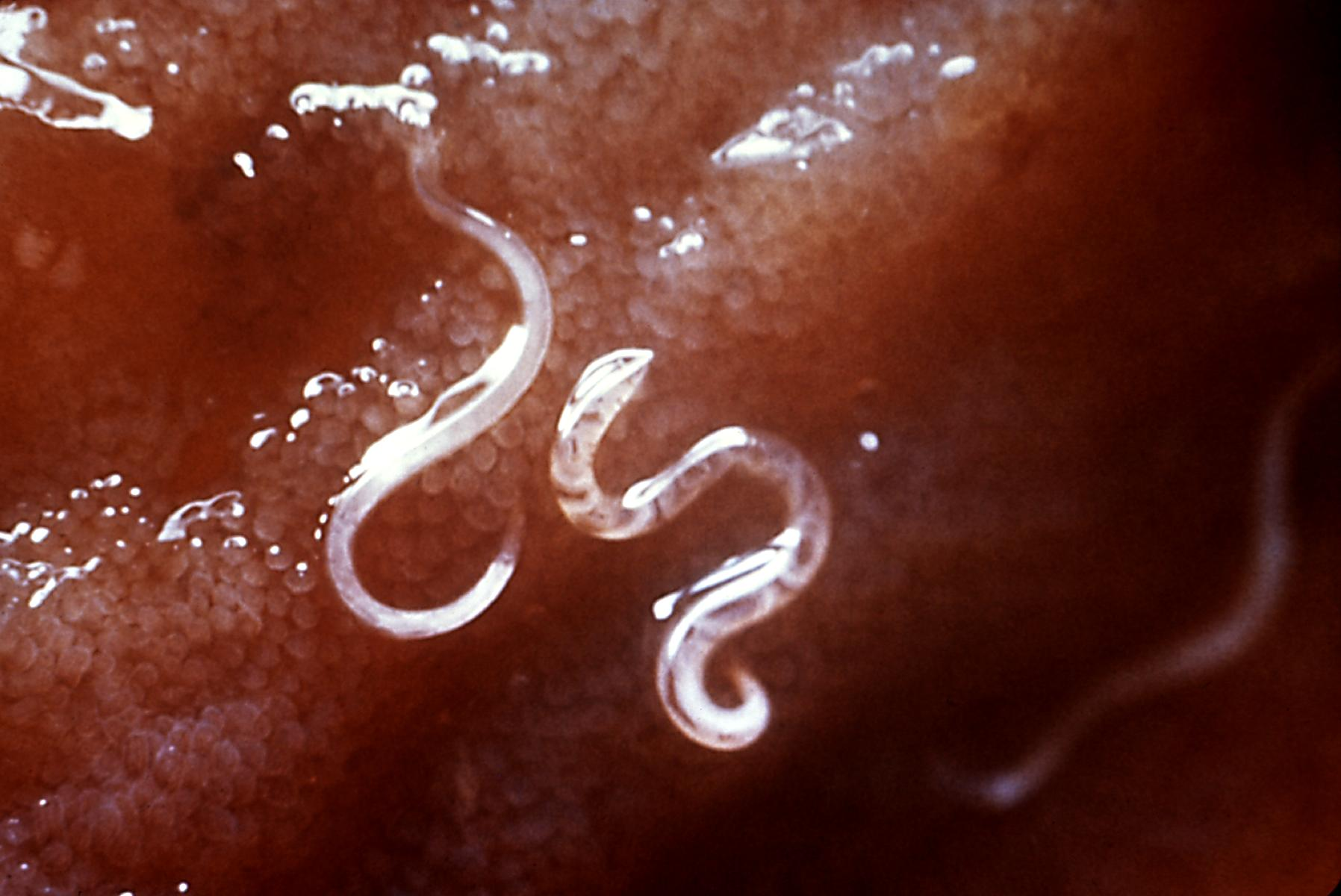
- Hookworms
- Specialty: Infectious disease
- Symptoms: Itchiness, localized rash, abdominal pain, diarrhea
- Complications: Anemia, protein deficiency
- Causes: Ancylostoma duodenale (old world hookworm), Necator americanus (new world hookworm)
- Risk factors: Walking barefoot in warm climates with poor sanitation
- Diagnostic method: Stool sample
- Prevention: Not walking barefoot, stopping outdoor defecation
- Medication: Albendazole, mebendazole, iron supplements
- Frequency: 428 million (2015)

Hookworm infection is an infection by a type of intestinal parasite known as a hookworm. Initially, itching and a rash may occur at the site of infection. Those only affected by a few worms may show no symptoms. Those infected by many worms may experience abdominal pain, diarrhea, weight loss, and tiredness. The mental and physical development of children may be affected. Anemia may result.

Two common hookworm infections in humans are ancylostomiasis and necatoriasis, caused by the species Ancylostoma duodenale and Necator americanus respectively. Hookworm eggs are deposited in the stools of infected people. If these end up in the environment, they can hatch into larvae (immature worms), which can then penetrate the skin. One type can also be spread through contaminated food. Risk factors include walking barefoot in warm climates, where sanitation is poor. Diagnosis is by examination of a stool sample with a microscope.

The risk of infection can be reduced on an individual level by not walking barefoot in areas where the disease is common. At a population level, decreasing outdoor defecation, not using raw feces as fertilizer, and mass deworming are effective. Treatment is typically with the medications albendazole or mebendazole for one to three days. Iron supplements may be needed in those with anemia.

Hookworms infected about 428 million people in 2015. Heavy infections can occur in both children and adults, but are less common in adults. They are rarely fatal. Hookworm infection is a soil-transmitted helminthiasis and classified as a neglected tropical disease.

== Signs and symptoms ==
No symptoms or signs are specific to hookworm infection, but they give rise to a combination of intestinal inflammation and progressive iron-deficiency anemia and protein deficiency. Coughing, chest pain, wheezing, and fever sometimes result from severe infection. Epigastric pains, indigestion, nausea, vomiting, constipation, and diarrhea can occur early or in later stages, as well, although gastrointestinal symptoms tend to improve with time. Signs of advanced severe infection are those of anemia and protein deficiency, including emaciation, cardiac failure, and abdominal distension with ascites.

Larval invasion of the skin (mostly in the Americas) can produce a skin disease called cutaneous larva migrans also known as creeping eruption. The hosts of these worms are not human and the larvae can only penetrate the upper five layers of the skin, where they give rise to intense, local itching, usually on the foot or lower leg, known as ground itch. This infection is due to larvae from the A. braziliense hookworm. The larvae migrate in tortuous tunnels between the stratum basale and stratum corneum of the skin, causing serpiginous vesicular lesions. With the advancing movement of the larvae, the rear portions of the lesions become dry and crusty. The lesions are typically intensely itchy.

=== Incubation period ===
The incubation period can vary between a few weeks to many months and is largely dependent on the number of hookworm parasites an individual is infected with.

== Cause ==
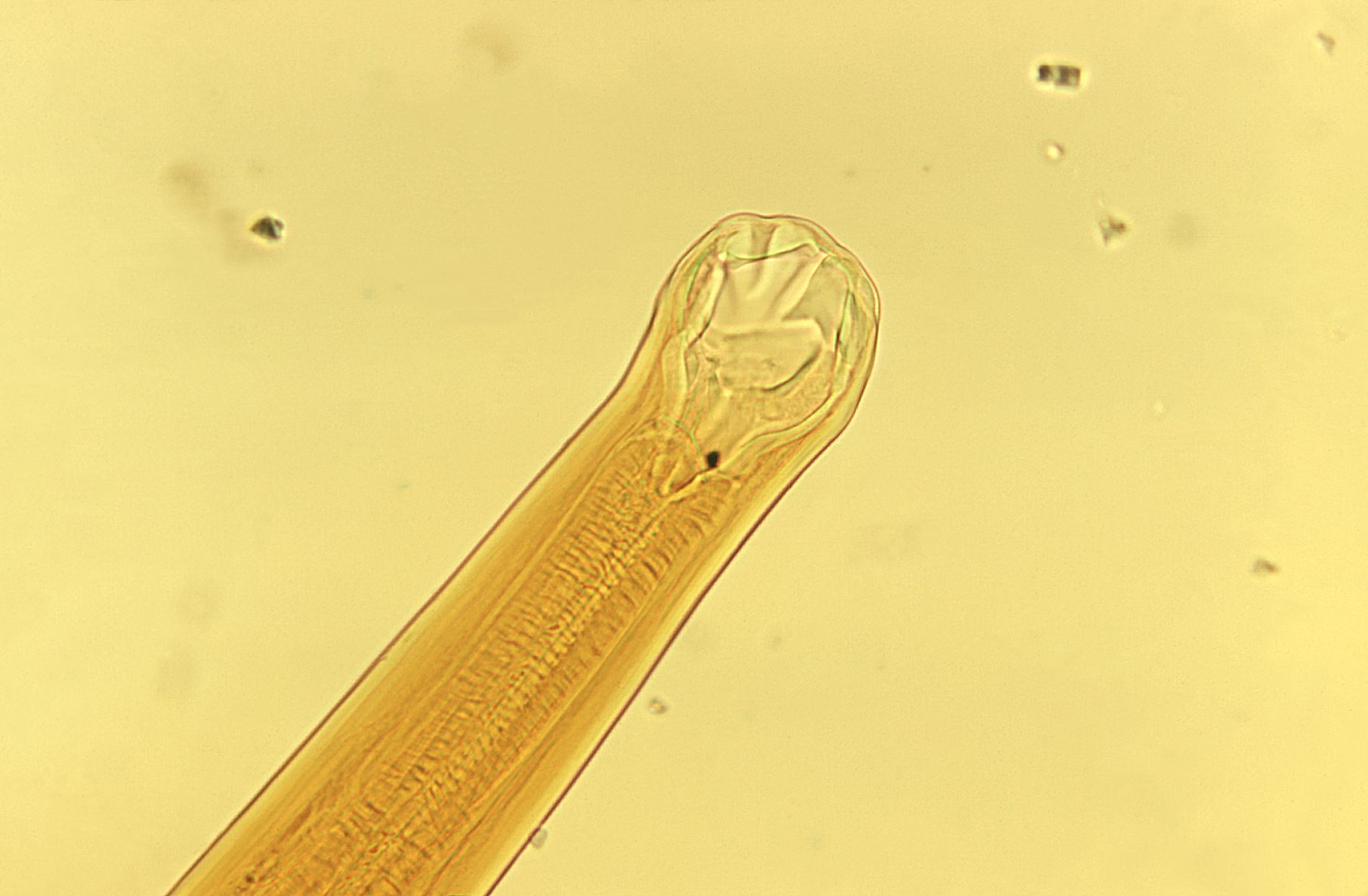
Ancylostoma braziliense mouthparts

Hookworm infections in humans include ancylostomiasis and necatoriasis. Ancylostomiasis is caused by Ancylostoma duodenale, which is the more common type found in the Middle East, North Africa, India, and (formerly) in southern Europe. Necatoriasis is caused by Necator americanus, the more common type in the Americas, sub-Saharan Africa, Southeast Asia, China, and Indonesia.

Other animals such as birds, dogs, and cats may also be affected. A. tubaeforme infects cats, A. caninum infects dogs, and A. braziliense and Uncinaria stenocephala infect both cats and dogs. Some of these infections can be transmitted to humans.

=== Morphology ===
A. duodenale worms are grayish-white or pinkish with the head slightly bent in relation to the rest of the body. This bend forms a definitive hook shape at the anterior end for which hookworms are named. They possess well-developed mouths with two pairs of teeth. While males measure approximately one centimeter by 0.5 millimeter, the females are often longer and stouter. Additionally, males can be distinguished from females based on the presence of a prominent posterior copulatory bursa.

N. americanus is very similar in morphology to A. duodenale. N. americanus is generally smaller than A. duodenale with males usually 5 to 9 mm long and females about 1 cm long. Whereas A. duodenale possesses two pairs of teeth, N. americanus possesses a pair of cutting plates in the buccal capsule. Additionally, the hook shape is much more defined in Necator than in Ancylostoma.

=== Life cycle ===
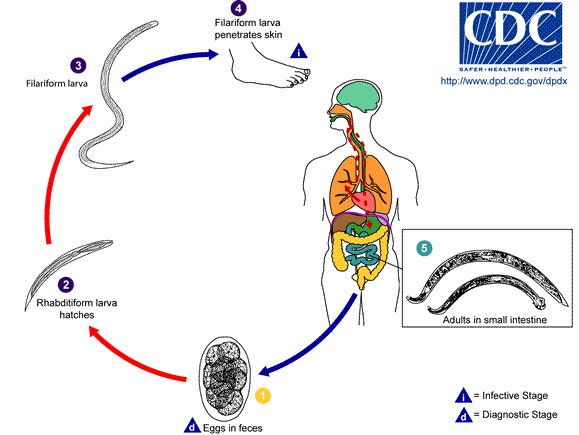
Hookworm life cycle

The hookworm thrives in warm soil where temperatures are over 18 °C (64 °F). They exist primarily in sandy or loamy soil and cannot live in clay or muck. Rainfall averages must be more than 1,000 mm (39 in) a year for them to survive. Only if these conditions exist can the eggs hatch. Infective larvae of N. americanus can survive at higher temperatures, whereas those of A. duodenale are better adapted to cooler climates. Generally, they live for only a few weeks at most under natural conditions and die almost immediately on exposure to direct sunlight or desiccation.

Infection of the host is by the larvae, not the eggs. While A. duodenale can be ingested, the usual method of infection is through the skin; this is commonly caused by walking barefoot through areas contaminated with fecal matter. The larvae can penetrate the skin of the foot, and once inside the body, they migrate through the vascular system to the lungs, and from there up the trachea, and are swallowed. They then pass down the esophagus and enter the digestive system, finishing their journey in the intestine, where the larvae mature into adult worms.

Once in the host gut, Necator tends to cause a prolonged infection, generally 1 to 5 years (many worms die within a year or two of infection), though some adult worms have been recorded to live for 15 years or more. Ancylostoma adults are short-lived, surviving on average for only about 6 months. However, the infection can be prolonged because dormant larvae can be "recruited" sequentially from tissue "stores" over many years, to replace expired adult worms. This can give rise to seasonal fluctuations in infection prevalence and intensity (apart from normal seasonal variations in transmission).

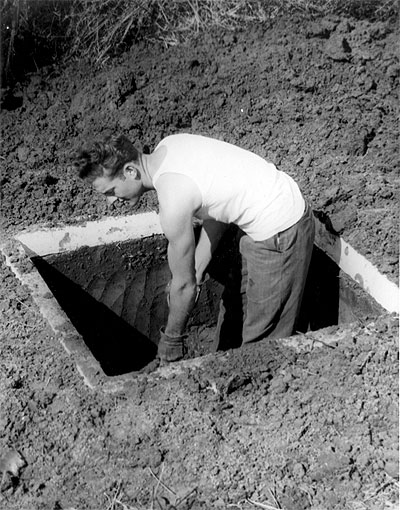
Civilian Public Service workers built and installed 2,065 outhouses for hookworm eradication in Mississippi and Florida from 1943 to 1947.

They mate inside the host, females laying from 10,000 to 30,000 eggs per day and some 15 to 56 million eggs during their adult lifetimes, which pass out in feces. Because 5 to 7 weeks are needed for adult worms to mature, mate, and produce eggs, in the early stages of very heavy infection, acute symptoms might occur without any eggs being detected in the patient's feces. This can make diagnosis very difficult.

N. americanus and A. duodenale eggs can be found in warm, moist soil where they eventually hatch into first-stage larvae, or L1. L1, the feeding noninfective rhabditoform stage, will feed on soil microbes and eventually molt into second-stage larvae, L2, which is also in the rhabditoform stage. It will feed for about 7 days and then molt into the third-stage larvae, or L3. This is the filariform stage of the parasite, that is, the nonfeeding infective form of the larvae. The L3 larvae are extremely motile and seek higher ground to increase their chances of penetrating the skin of a human host. The L3 larvae can survive up to 2 weeks without finding a host. While N. americanus larvae only infect through penetration of the skin, A. duodenale can infect both through penetration and orally. After the L3 larvae have successfully entered the host, they then travel through the subcutaneous venules and lymphatic vessels of the human host. Eventually, the L3 larvae enter the lungs through the pulmonary capillaries and break out into the alveoli. They then travel up the trachea to be coughed and swallowed by the host. After being swallowed, the L3 larvae are then found in the small intestine, where they molt into the L4, or adult worm stage. The entire process from skin penetration to adult development takes about 5–9 weeks. The female adult worms release eggs (N. americanus about 9,000–10,000 eggs/day and A. duodenale 25,000–30,000 eggs/day), which are passed in the feces of the human host. These eggs hatch in the environment within several days and the cycle starts anew.

== Pathophysiology ==
Hookworm infection is generally considered to be asymptomatic, but as Norman Stoll described in 1962, it is an extremely dangerous infection because its damage is "silent and insidious." An individual may experience general symptoms soon after infection. Ground-itch, which is an allergic reaction at the site of parasitic penetration and entry, is common in patients infected with N. americanus. Additionally, cough and pneumonitis may result as the larvae begin to break into the alveoli and travel up the trachea. Then once the larvae reach the small intestine of the host and begin to mature, the infected individual will experience diarrhea and other gastrointestinal discomfort. However, the "silent and insidious" symptoms referred to by Stoll are related to chronic, heavy-intensity hookworm infections. Major morbidity associated with hookworm infection is caused by intestinal blood loss, iron deficiency anemia, and protein malnutrition. They result mainly from adult hookworms in the small intestine ingesting blood, rupturing erythrocytes, and degrading hemoglobin in the host. This long-term blood loss can manifest itself physically through facial and peripheral edema; eosinophilia and pica/geophagy caused by iron deficiency anemia are also experienced by some hookworm-infected patients. Recently, more attention has been given to other important outcomes of hookworm infection that play a large role in public health. It is now widely accepted that children who have chronic hookworm infection can experience growth retardation as well as intellectual and cognitive impairments. Additionally, recent research has focused on the potential of adverse maternal-fetal outcomes when the mother is infected with hookworm during pregnancy.

The disease was linked to nematode worms (Ankylostoma duodenalis) from one-third to half an inch long in the intestine chiefly through the labours of Theodor Bilharz and Griesinger in Egypt (1854).

The symptoms can be linked to inflammation in the gut stimulated by feeding hookworms, such as nausea, abdominal pain and intermittent diarrhea, and to progressive anemia in prolonged disease: capricious appetite, pica/geophagy (or dirt-eating), obstinate constipation followed by diarrhea, palpitations, thready pulse, coldness of the skin, pallor of the mucous membranes, fatigue and weakness, shortness of breath and in cases running a fatal course, dysentery, hemorrhages and edema. The worms suck blood and damage the mucosa. However, the blood loss in the stools is not visibly apparent.

Blood tests in early infection often show a rise in numbers of eosinophils, a type of white blood cell that is preferentially stimulated by worm infections in tissues (large numbers of eosinophils are also present in the local inflammatory response). Falling blood hemoglobin levels will be seen in cases of prolonged infection with anemia.

In contrast to most intestinal helminthiases, where the heaviest parasitic loads tend to occur in children, hookworm prevalence and intensity can be higher among adult males. The explanation for this is that hookworm infection tends to be occupational so that coworkers and other close groups maintain a high prevalence of infection among themselves by contaminating their work environment. However, in most endemic areas, adult women are the most severely affected by anemia, mainly because they have much higher physiological needs for iron (menstruation, repeated pregnancy). An interesting consequence of this in the case of Ancylostoma duodenale infection is translactational transmission of infection: the skin-invasive larvae of this species do not all immediately pass through the lungs and on into the gut, but spread around the body via the circulation, to become dormant inside muscle fibers. In a pregnant woman, after childbirth some or all of these larvae are stimulated to re-enter the circulation (presumably by sudden hormonal changes), then to pass into the mammary glands, so that the newborn baby can receive a large dose of infective larvae through its mother's milk. This accounts for otherwise inexplicable cases of very heavy, even fatal, hookworm infections in children a month or so of age, in places such as China, India, and northern Australia. An identical phenomenon is much more commonly seen with Ancylostoma caninum infections in dogs, where the newborn pups can even die of hemorrhaging from their intestines caused by massive numbers of feeding hookworms. This also reflects the close evolutionary link between the human and canine parasites, which probably have a common ancestor dating back to when humans and dogs first started living closely together. Filariform larvae are the infective stage of the parasite: infection occurs when larvae in soil penetrate the skin, or when they are ingested through contaminated food and water following skin penetration.

== Diagnosis ==
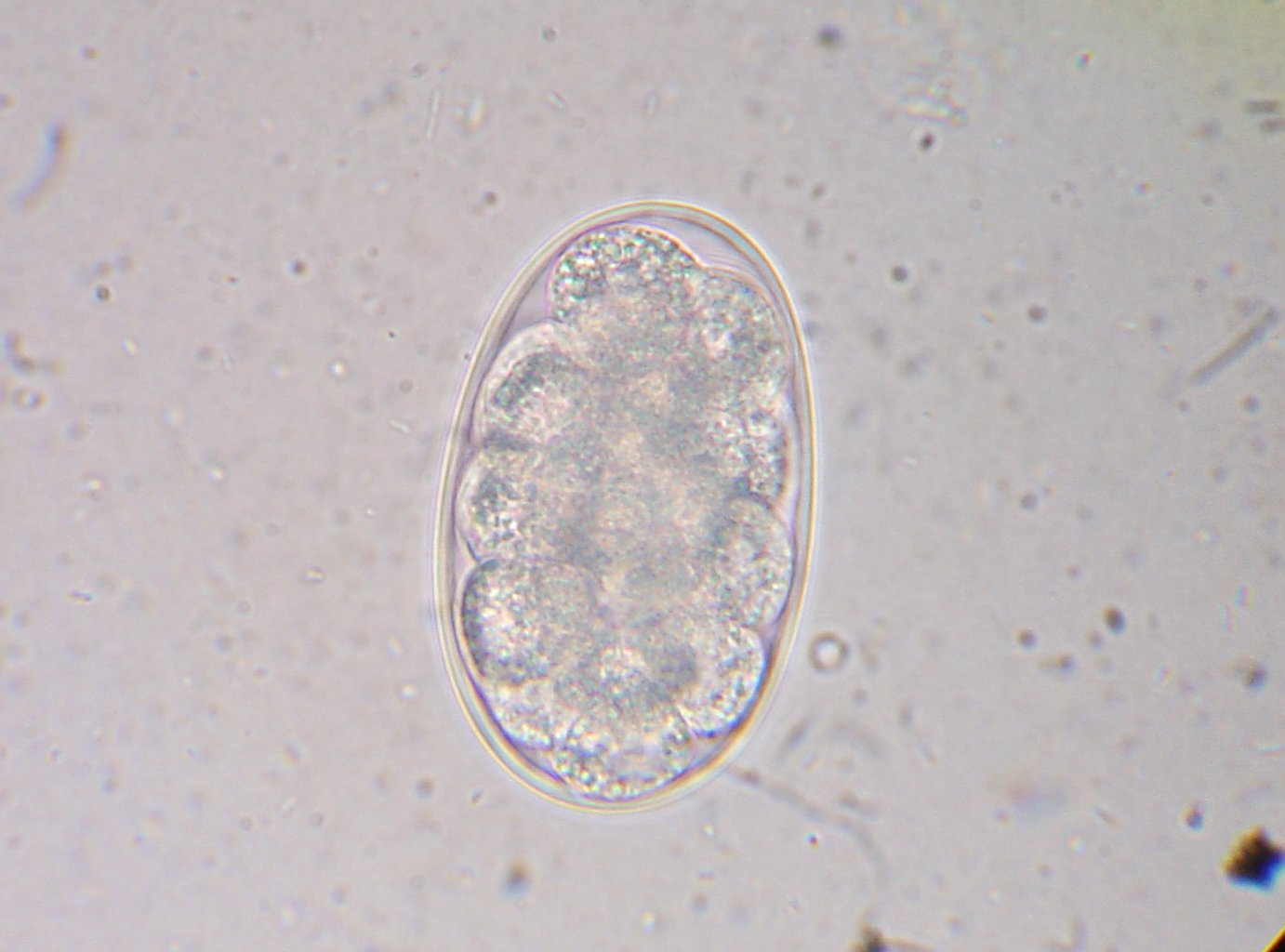
Hookworm egg

Diagnosis depends on finding characteristic worm eggs on microscopic examination of the stools, although this is not possible in early infection. Early signs of infection in most dogs include limbular limping and anal itching. The eggs are oval or elliptical, measuring 60 by 40 μm, colorless, not bile stained, and with a thin transparent hyaline shell membrane. When released by the worm in the intestine, the egg contains an unsegmented ovum. During its passage down the intestine, the ovum develops and thus the eggs passed in feces have a segmented ovum, usually with 4 to 8 blastomeres. As the eggs of both Ancylostoma and Necator (and most other hookworm species) are indistinguishable, to identify the genus, they must be cultured in the lab to allow larvae to hatch out. If the fecal sample is left for a day or more under tropical conditions, the larvae will have hatched out, so eggs might no longer be evident. In such a case, it is essential to distinguish hookworms from Strongyloides larvae, as infection with the latter has more serious implications and requires different management. The larvae of the two hookworm species can also be distinguished microscopically, although this would not be done routinely, but usually for research purposes. Adult worms are rarely seen (except via endoscopy, surgery or autopsy), but if found, would allow definitive identification of the species. Classification can be performed based on the length of the buccal cavity, the space between the oral opening and the esophagus: hookworm rhabditoform larvae have long buccal cavities whereas Strongyloides rhabditoform larvae have short buccal cavities.

Recent research has focused on the development of DNA-based tools for diagnosis of infection, specific identification of hookworm, and analysis of genetic variability within hookworm populations. Because hookworm eggs are often indistinguishable from other parasitic eggs, PCR assays could serve as a molecular approach for accurate diagnosis of hookworm in the feces.

== Prevention ==
The infective larvae develop and survive in an environment of damp dirt, particularly sandy and loamy soil. They cannot survive in clay or muck. The main lines of precaution are those dictated by good hygiene behaviors:

- Do not defecate in the open, but rather in toilets.
- Do not use untreated human excreta or raw sewage as fertilizer in agriculture.
- Do not walk barefoot in known infected areas.
- Deworm pet dogs and cats. Canine and feline hookworms rarely develop to adulthood in humans. Ancylostoma caninum, the common dog hookworm, occasionally develops into an adult to cause eosinophilic enteritis in people, but their invasive larvae can cause an itchy rash called cutaneous larva migrans.

Moxidectin is available in the United States as (imidacloprid + moxidectin) topical solution for dogs and cats. It utilizes moxidectin for control and prevention of roundworms, hookworms, heartworms, and whipworms.

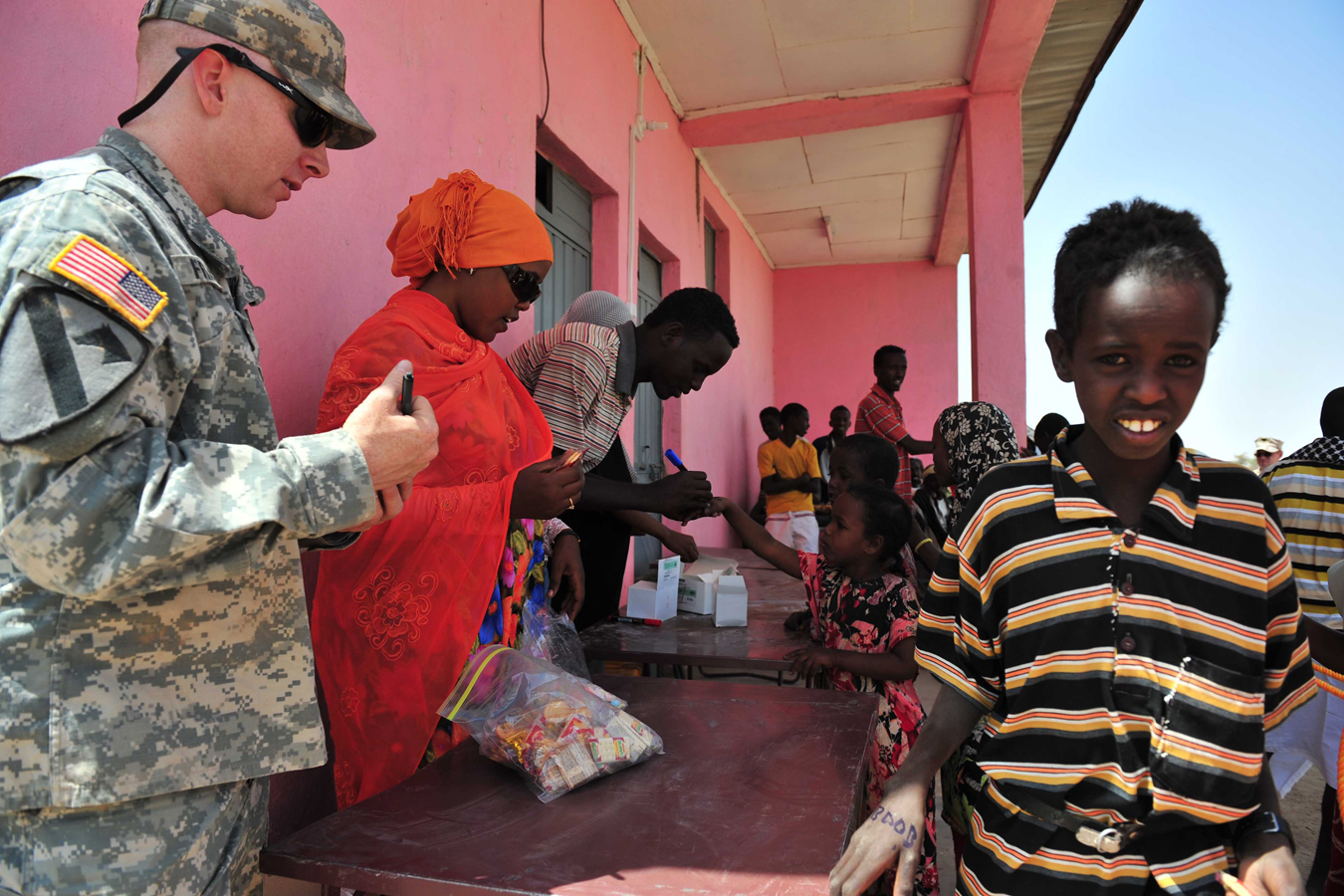
Ethiopian children treated for schistosoma and hookworms

=== Children ===
Most of these public health concerns have focused on children who are infected with hookworm. This focus on children is largely due to the large body of evidence that has demonstrated strong associations between hookworm infection and impaired learning, increased absences from school, and decreased future economic productivity. In 2001, the 54th World Health Assembly passed a resolution demanding member states to attain a minimum target of regular deworming of at least 75% of all at-risk school children by the year 2010. A 2008 World Health Organization publication reported on these efforts to treat at-risk school children. Some of the interesting statistics were as follows: 1) only 9 out of 130 endemic countries were able to reach the 75% target goal; and 2) less than 77 million school-aged children (of the total 878 million at risk) were reached, which means that only 8.78% of at-risk children are being treated for hookworm infection.

=== School-based mass deworming ===
School-based mass deworming programs have been the most popular strategy to address the issue of hookworm infection in children. School-based programs are extremely cost-effective as schools already have an available, extensive, and sustained infrastructure with a skilled workforce that has a close relationship with the community. With little training from a local health system, teachers can easily administer the drugs which often cost less than US$0.50 per child per year.

Recently, many people have questioned if the school-based programs are necessarily the most effective approach. An important concern with school-based programs is that they often do not reach children who do not attend school, thus ignoring a large number of at-risk children. A 2008 study by Massa et al. continued the debate regarding school-based programs. They examined the effects of community-directed treatments versus school-based treatments in the Tanga Region of Tanzania. A major conclusion was that the mean infection intensity of hookworm was significantly lower in the villages employing the community-directed treatment approach than the school-based approach. The community-directed treatment model used in this specific study allowed villagers to take control of the child's treatment by having villagers select their own community drug distributors to administer the antihelminthic drugs. Additionally, villagers organized and implemented their own methods for distributing the drugs to all children. The positive results associated with this new model highlight the need for large-scale community involvement in deworming campaigns.

=== Public health education ===
Many mass deworming programs also combine their efforts with public health education. These health education programs often stress important preventative techniques such as: washing your hands before eating and staying away from water/areas contaminated by human feces. These programs may also stress that shoes must be worn, however, these come with their own health risks and may not be effective. Shoe wearing patterns in towns and villages across the globe are determined by cultural beliefs, and the levels of education within that society. The wearing of shoes will prevent the entry of hookworm infections from the surrounding soils into tender skin regions; such as areas between the toes.

=== Sanitation ===
Historical examples, such as the hookworm campaigns in Mississippi and Florida from 1943 to 1947 have shown that the primary cause of hookworm infection is poor sanitation, which can be solved by building and maintaining toilets. But while these may seem like simple tasks, they raise important public health challenges. Most infected populations are from poverty-stricken areas with very poor sanitation. Thus, it is most likely that at-risk children do not have access to clean water to wash their hands and live in environments with no proper sanitation infrastructure. Health education, therefore, must address preventive measures in ways that are both feasible and sustainable in the context of resource-limited settings.

=== Integrated approaches ===
Evaluation of numerous public health interventions has generally shown that improvement in each individual component ordinarily attributed to poverty (for example, sanitation, health education, and underlying nutrition status) often has minimal impact on transmission. For example, one study found that the introduction of latrines into a resource-limited community only reduced the prevalence of hookworm infection by four percent. However, another study in Salvador, Brazil found that improved drainage and sewerage had a significant impact on the prevalence of hookworm infection but no impact at all on the intensity of hookworm infection. This seems to suggest that environmental control alone has a limited but incomplete effect on the transmission of hookworms. It is imperative, therefore, that more research is performed to understand the efficacy and sustainability of integrated programs that combine numerous preventive methods including education, sanitation, and treatment.

== Treatment ==
=== Anthelmintic drugs ===
The most common treatments for hookworm are benzimidazoles, specifically albendazole and mebendazole. BZAs kill adult worms by binding to the nematode's β-tubulin and subsequently inhibiting microtubule polymerization within the parasite. In certain circumstances, levamisole and pyrantel pamoate may be used. A 2008 review found that the efficacy of single-dose treatments for hookworm infections were as follows: 72% for albendazole, 15% for mebendazole, and 31% for pyrantel pamoate. This substantiates prior claims that albendazole is much more effective than mebendazole for hookworm infections. Also of note is that the World Health Organization does recommend anthelmintic treatment in pregnant women after the first trimester. It is also recommended that if the patient also has anemia that ferrous sulfate (200 mg) be administered three times daily at the same time as anthelmintic treatment; this should be continued until hemoglobin values return to normal which could take up to 3 months.

Hookworm infection can be treated with local cryotherapy when the hookworm is still in the skin.

Albendazole is effective both in the intestinal stage and during the stage the parasite is still migrating under the skin.

In the case of anemia, iron supplementation can cause relief symptoms of iron-deficiency anemia. However, as red blood cell levels are restored, a shortage of other essentials such as folic acid or vitamin B_{12} may develop, so these might also be supplemented.

During the 1910s, common treatments for hookworm included thymol, 2-naphthol, chloroform, gasoline, and eucalyptus oil. By the 1940s, the treatment of choice used tetrachloroethylene, given as 3 to 4 cc in the fasting state, followed by 30 to 45 g of sodium sulfate. Tetrachloroethylene was reported to have a cure rate of 80 percent for Necator infections, but 25 percent in Ancylostoma infections, and often produced mild intoxication in the patient.

=== Reinfection and drug resistance ===
Other important issues related to the treatment of hookworm are reinfection and drug resistance. It has been shown that reinfection after treatment can be extremely high. Some studies even show that 80% of pretreatment hookworm infection rates can be seen in treated communities within 30–36 months. While reinfection may occur, it is still recommended that regular treatments be conducted as it will minimize the occurrence of chronic outcomes. There are also increasing concerns about the issue of drug resistance. Drug resistance has appeared in front-line anthelmintics used for livestock nematodes. Generally, human nematodes are less likely to develop resistance due to longer reproducing times, less frequent treatment, and more targeted treatment. Nonetheless, the global community must be careful to maintain the effectiveness of current anthelmintic as no new anthelmintic drugs are in the late-stage development.

== Epidemiology ==
Disability-adjusted life year for hookworm disease per 100,000 inhabitants in 2002 no data <10 10–15 15–20 20–25 25–30 30–35 35–40 40–45 45–50 50–55 55–60 more than 60

It is estimated that between 576 and 740 million individuals are infected with hookworm. Of these infected individuals, about 80 million are severely affected. The major cause of hookworm infection is N. americanus which is found in the Americas, sub-Saharan Africa, and Asia. A. duodenale is found in more scattered focal environments, namely Europe and the Mediterranean. Most infected individuals are concentrated in sub-Saharan Africa and East Asia/the Pacific Islands with each region having estimates of 198 million and 149 million infected individuals, respectively. Other affected regions include: South Asia (50 million), Latin America and the Caribbean (50 million), South Asia (59 million), and Middle East/North Africa (10 million). A majority of these infected individuals live in poverty-stricken areas with poor sanitation. Hookworm infection is most concentrated among the world's poorest who live on less than $2 a day.

While hookworm infection may not directly lead to mortality, its effects on morbidity demand immediate attention. When considering disability-adjusted life years (DALYs), neglected tropical diseases, including hookworm infection, rank among diarrheal diseases, ischemic heart disease, malaria, and tuberculosis as one of the most important health problems of the developing world.

It has been estimated that as many as 22.1 million DALYs have been lost due to hookworm infection. Recently, there has been increasing interest to address the public health concerns associated with hookworm infection. For example, the Bill & Melinda Gates Foundation recently donated US$34 million to fight Neglected Tropical Diseases including hookworm infection. Former US President Clinton also announced a mega-commitment at the Clinton Global Initiative (CGI) 2008 Annual Meeting to de-worm 10 million children.

Many of the numbers regarding the prevalence of hookworm infection are estimates as there is no international surveillance mechanism currently in place to determine prevalence and global distribution. Some prevalence rates have been measured through survey data in endemic regions around the world. The following are some of the most recent findings on prevalence rates in regions endemic with hookworm.

Darjeeling, Hooghly District, West Bengal, India (Pal et al. 2007)

- 43% infection rate of predominantly N. americanus although with some A. duodenale infection
- Both hookworm infection load and degree of anemia in the mild range

Xiulongkan Village, Hainan Province, China (Gandhi et al. 2001)

- 60% infection rate of predominantly N. americanus
- Important trends noted were that prevalence increased with age (plateau of about 41 years) and women had higher prevalence rates than men

Hòa Bình, Northwest Vietnam (Verle et al. 2003)

- 52% of a total of 526 tested households infected
- Could not identify species, but previous studies in North Vietnam reported N. americanus in more than 95% of hookworm larvae

Minas Gerais, Brazil (Fleming et al. 2006)

- 63% infection rate of predominantly N. americanus

KwaZulu-Natal, South Africa (Mabaso et al. 2004)

- Inland areas had a prevalence rate of 9% of N. americanus
- Coastal plain areas had a prevalence rate of 63% of N. americanus

Lowndes County, Alabama, United States

- 35% infection rate of predominantly N. americanus

There have also been technological developments that may facilitate more accurate mapping of hookworm prevalence. Some researchers have begun to use geographical information systems (GIS) and remote sensing (RS) to examine helminth ecology and epidemiology. Brooker et al. utilized this technology to create helminth distribution maps of sub-Saharan Africa. By relating satellite-derived environmental data with prevalence data from school-based surveys, they were able to create detailed prevalence maps. The study focused on a wide range of helminths, but interesting conclusions about hookworm specifically were found. As compared to other helminths, hookworms can survive in much hotter conditions and were highly prevalent throughout the upper end of the thermal range.

Another technological advancement that could improve the statistical prevalence of hookworm is improved modern molecular diagnostic tools. Recent research has focused on the development of a DNA-based tool that can be used for diagnosis of infection, specific identification of hookworm, and analysis of genetic variability in hookworm populations. This could serve as a major tool for public health measures against hookworm infection. Most research regarding diagnostic tools is now focused on the creation of a rapid and cost-effective assay for the specific diagnosis of hookworm infection.

== History ==
=== Discovery ===
The symptoms now attributed to hookworm appear in papyrus papers of ancient Egypt (c. 1500 BC), described as a derangement characterized by anemia. Avicenna, a Persian physician of the eleventh century, discovered the worm in several of his patients and related it to their disease. In later times, the condition was noticeably prevalent in the mining industry in England, France, Germany, Belgium, North Queensland, and elsewhere.

Italian physician Angelo Dubini was the modern-day discoverer of the worm in 1838 after an autopsy of a peasant woman. Dubini published details in 1843 and identified the species as A. duodenale. Working in the Egyptian medical system in 1852 German physician Theodor Bilharz, drawing upon the work of colleague Wilhelm Griesinger, found these worms during autopsies and went a step further in linking them to local endemic occurrences of chlorosis, which would probably be called iron-deficiency anemia today.

A breakthrough came 25 years later following a diarrhea and anemia epidemic that took place among Italian workmen employed on the Gotthard Rail Tunnel. In an 1880 paper, physicians Camillo Bozzolo, Edoardo Perroncito, and Luigi Pagliani correctly hypothesized that hookworm was linked to the fact that workers had to defecate inside the 15 km tunnel, and that many wore worn-out shoes. The work environment often contained standing water, sometimes knee-deep, and the larvae were capable of surviving several weeks in the water, allowing them to infect many of the workers. In 1897, it was established that the skin was the principal avenue of infection and the biological life cycle of the hookworm was clarified.

=== Eradication programmes ===
In 1899, American zoologist Charles Wardell Stiles identified progressive pernicious anemia seen in the southern United States as being caused by the hookworm A. duodenale. Testing in the 1900s revealed very heavy infestations in school-age children. In Puerto Rico, Dr. Bailey K. Ashford, a US Army physician, organized and conducted a parasite treatment campaign, which cured approximately 300,000 people (one-third of the Puerto Rican population) and reduced the death rate from this anemia by 90 percent during the years 1903–04.

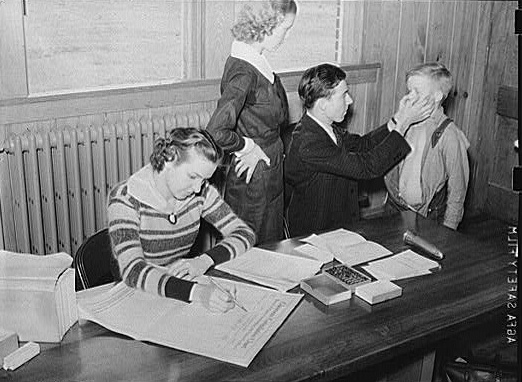
A doctor examines a boy for signs of hookworm in Coffee County, Alabama, 1939.

On October 26, 1909, the Rockefeller Sanitary Commission for the Eradication of Hookworm Disease was organized as a result of a gift of US$1 million from John D. Rockefeller, Sr. The five-year program was a remarkable success and a great contribution to the United States' public health, instilling public education, medication, field work and modern government health departments in eleven southern states. The hookworm exhibit was a prominent part of the 1910 Mississippi State Fair.

The commission found that an average of 40% of school-aged children were infected with hookworm. Areas with higher levels of hookworm infection prior to the eradication program experienced greater increases in school enrollment, attendance, and literacy after the intervention. Econometric studies have shown that this effect cannot be explained by a variety of alternative factors, including differential trends across areas, changing crop prices, shifts in certain educational and health policies, and the effect of malaria eradication. No significant contemporaneous results were found for adults who should have benefited less from the intervention owing to their substantially lower (prior) infection rates. The program nearly eradicated hookworm and would flourish afterward with new funding as the Rockefeller Foundation International Health Division.

The RF's hookworm campaign in Mexico showed how science and politics play a role in developing health policies. It brought together government officials, health officials, public health workers, Rockefeller officials, and the community. This campaign was launched to eradicate hookworms in Mexico. Although the campaign did not focus on long-term treatments, it did set the terms of the relationship between Mexico and the Rockefeller Foundation. The scientific knowledge behind this campaign helped shape public health policies, improved public health and built a strong relationship between US and Mexico.

In the 1920s, hookworm eradication reached the Caribbean and Latin America, where great mortality was reported among people in the West Indies towards the end of the 18th century, as well as through descriptions sent from Brazil and various other tropical and subtropical regions.

=== Treatments ===
Treatment in the early 20th century relied on the use of Epsom salt to reduce protective mucus, followed by thymol to kill the worms. By the 1940s, tetrachloroethylene was the leading method. It was not until later in the mid-20th century when new organic drug compounds were developed.

== Research ==
=== Anemia in pregnancy ===
It is estimated that a third of all pregnant women in developing countries are infected with hookworm, 56% of all pregnant women in developing countries experience anemia, and 20% of all maternal deaths are either directly or indirectly related to anemia. Numbers like this have led to an increased interest in the topic of hookworm-related anemia during pregnancy. With the understanding that chronic hookworm infection can often lead to anemia, many people are now questioning if the treatment of hookworm could effect change in severe anemia rates and thus also on maternal and child health as well. Most evidence suggests that the contribution of hookworm to maternal anemia merits that all women of child-bearing age living in endemic areas be subject to periodic anthelmintic treatment. The World Health Organization even recommends that infected pregnant women be treated after their first trimester. Regardless of these suggestions, only Madagascar, Nepal, and Sri Lanka have added deworming to their antenatal care programs.

This lack of deworming of pregnant women is explained by the fact that most individuals still fear that anthelmintic treatment will result in adverse birth outcomes. However, a 2006 study by Gyorkos et al. found that when comparing a group of pregnant women treated with mebendazole with a control placebo group, both illustrated rather similar rates of adverse birth outcomes. The treated group demonstrated 5.6% adverse birth outcomes, while the control group had 6.25% adverse birth outcomes. Furthermore, Larocque et al. illustrated that treatment for hookworm infection actually led to positive health results in the infant. This study concluded that treatment with mebendazole plus iron supplements during antenatal care significantly reduced the proportion of very low birth weight infants when compared to a placebo control group. Studies so far have validated recommendations to treat infected pregnant women for hookworm infection during pregnancy.

A review found that a single dose of antihelminthics (anti-worm drugs) given in the second trimester of pregnancy "may reduce maternal anaemia and worm prevalence when used in settings with a high prevalence of maternal helminthiasis".

The intensity of hookworm infection as well as the species of hookworm have yet to be studied as they relate to hookworm-related anemia during pregnancy. Additionally, more research must be done in different regions of the world to see if trends noted in completed studies persist.

=== Malaria co-infection ===
Co-infection with hookworm and Plasmodium falciparum is common in Africa. Although exact numbers are unknown, preliminary analyses estimate that as many as a quarter of African schoolchildren (17.8–32.1 million children aged 5–14 years) may be coincidentally at-risk of both P. falciparum and hookworm. While original hypotheses stated that co-infection with multiple parasites would impair the host's immune response to a single parasite and increase susceptibility to clinical disease, studies have yielded contrasting results. For example, one study in Senegal showed that the risk of clinical malaria infection was increased in helminth-infected children in comparison to helminth-free children while other studies have failed to reproduce such results, and even among laboratory mouse experiments the effect of helminths on malaria is variable.

Some hypotheses and studies suggest that helminth infections may protect against cerebral malaria due to the possible modulation of pro-inflammatory and anti-inflammatory cytokine responses. Furthermore, the mechanisms underlying this supposed increased susceptibility to disease are unknown. For example, helminth infections cause potent and highly polarized immune response characterized by increased T-helper cell type 2 (T_{h}2) cytokine and Immunoglobulin E (IgE) production. However, the effect of such responses on the human immune response is unknown. Additionally, both malaria and helminth infection can cause anemia, but the effect of co-infection and possible enhancement of anemia is poorly understood.

=== Hygiene hypothesis and hookworm as therapy ===
The hygiene hypothesis states that infants and children who lack exposure to infectious agents are more susceptible to allergic diseases via modulation of immune system development. The theory was first proposed by David P. Strachan who noted that hay fever and eczema were less common in children who belonged to large families. Since then, studies have noted the effect of gastrointestinal worms on the development of allergies in the developing world. For example, a study in Gambia found that the eradication of worms in some villages led to increased skin reactions to allergies among children.

=== Vaccines ===
While annual or semi-annual mass antihelminthic administration is a critical aspect of any public health intervention, many have begun to realize how unsustainable it is due to aspects such as poverty, high rates of re-infection, and diminished efficacy of drugs with repeated use. Current research, therefore, has focused on the development of a vaccine that could be integrated into existing control programs. The goal of vaccine development is not necessarily to create a vaccine with sterilizing immunity or complete protection against immunity. A vaccine that reduces the likelihood of vaccinated individuals developing severe infections and thus reduced blood and nutrient levels could still have a significant impact on the high burden of disease throughout the world.

Current research focuses on targeting two stages in the development of the worm: the larval stage and the adult stage. Research on larval antigens has focused on proteins that are members of the pathogenesis-related protein superfamily, Ancylostoma Secreted Proteins. Although they were first described in Anyclostoma, these proteins have also been successfully isolated from the secreted product of N. americanus. N. americanus ASP-2 (Na-ASP-2) is currently the leading larval-stage hookworm vaccine candidate. A randomized, double-blind, placebo-controlled study has already been performed; 36 healthy adults without a history of hookworm infection were given three intramuscular injections of three different concentrations of Na-ASP-2 and observed for six months after the final vaccination. The vaccine induced significant anti-Na-ASP-2 IgG and cellular immune responses. In addition, it was safe and produced no debilitating side effects. The vaccine is now in a phase one trial; healthy adult volunteers with documented evidence of previous infection in Brazil are being given the same dose concentration on the same schedule used in the initial study. If this study is successful, the next step would be to conduct a phase two trial to assess the rate and intensity of hookworm infection among vaccinated persons. Because the Na-ASP-2 vaccine only targets the larval stage, it is critical that all subjects enrolled in the study be treated with antihelminthic drugs to eliminate adult worms prior to vaccination.

Adult hookworm antigens have also been identified as potential candidates for vaccines. When adult worms attach to the intestinal mucosa of the human host, erythrocytes are ruptured in the worm's digestive tract which causes the release of free hemoglobin which is subsequently degraded by a proteolytic cascade. Several of these proteins that are responsible for this proteolytic cascade are also essential for the worm's nutrition and survival. Therefore, a vaccine that could induce antibodies for these antigens could interfere with the hookworm's digestive pathway and impair the worm's survival. Three proteins have been identified: the aspartic protease-hemoglobinase APR-1, the cysteine protease-hemoglobinase CP-2, and a glutathione S-transferase. Vaccination with APR-1 and CP-2 led to reduced host blood loss and fecal egg counts in dogs. With APR-1, vaccination even led to reduced worm burden. Research is currently stymied at the development of at least one of these antigens as a recombinant protein for testing in clinical trials.

== Terminology ==
The term "hookworm" is sometimes used to refer to hookworm infection. A hookworm is a type of parasitic worm (helminth).

== See also ==
- List of parasites (human)
