= Necatoriasis =

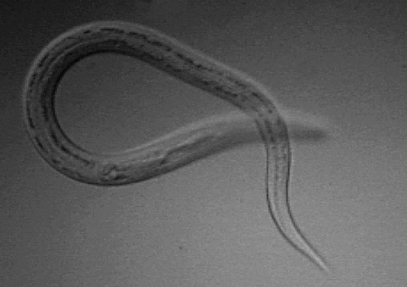
- Infective larva of Necator americanus
- Specialty: Infectious diseases

Necatoriasis is the condition of infection by Necator hookworms, such as Necator americanus. This hookworm infection is a type of helminthiasis (infection) which is a type of neglected tropical disease.

== Signs and symptoms ==
When adult worms attach to the villi of the small intestine, they suck on the host's blood, which may cause abdominal pain, diarrhea, cramps, and weight loss that can lead to anorexia. Heavy infections can lead to the development of iron deficiency and hypochromic microcytic anemia. This form of anemia in children can give rise to physical and intellectual disability. Infection caused by cutaneous larvae migrans, a skin disease in humans, is characterized by skin ruptures and severe itching.

== Cause ==
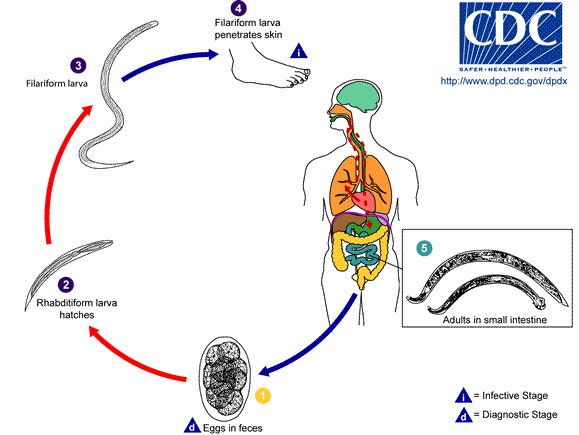
Lifecycle of a hookworm

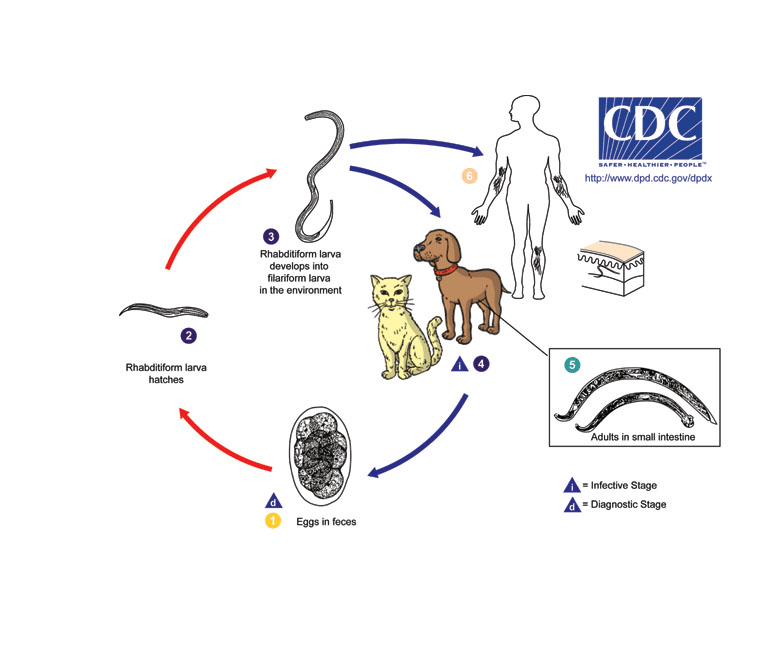
Cutaneous larvae migrans

Necatoriasis is caused by N. americanus. N. americanus can be divided into two areas – larvae and adult stage. The third stage larvae are guided to human skin by following thermal gradients. Typically, the larvae enter through the hands and feet following contact with contaminated soil. A papular, pruritic, itchy rash will develop around the site of entry into the human host. This is also known as "ground itch". Generally, migration through the lungs is asymptomatic but a mild cough and pharyngeal irritation may occur during larval migration in the airways. Once larvae break through the alveoli and are swallowed, they enter the gastrointestinal tract and attach to the intestinal mucosa where they mature into adult worms. The hookworms attach to the mucosal lining using their cutting plates which allows them to penetrate blood vessels and feed on the host's blood supply. Each worm consumes 30 μl of blood per day. The major issue results from this intestinal blood loss which can lead to iron-deficiency anemia in moderate to heavy infections. Other common symptoms include epigastric pain and tenderness, nausea, exertional dyspnea, pain in lower extremities and in joints, sternal pain, headache, fatigue, and impotence. Death is rare in humans.

== Diagnosis ==
The standard method for diagnosing necatoriasis is through identification of N. americanus eggs in a fecal sample using a microscope. Eggs can be difficult to visualize in a lightly infected sample so a concentration method is generally used such as flotation or sedimentation. However, the eggs of A. duodenale and N. americanus cannot be distinguished; thus, the larvae must be examined to identify these hookworms. Larvae cannot be found in stool specimens unless the specimen was left at ambient temperature for a day or more.

The most common technique used to diagnose a hookworm infection is to take a stool sample, fix it in 10% formalin, concentrate it using the formalin-ethyl acetate sedimentation technique, and then create a wet mount of the sediment for viewing under a microscope.

== Prevention ==
Education, improved sanitation, and controlled disposal of human feces are critical for prevention. Nonetheless, wearing shoes in endemic areas helps reduce the prevalence of infection.

== Treatment ==
An infection of N. americanus parasites can be treated by using benzimidazoles: albendazole or mebendazole. A blood transfusion may be necessary in severe cases of anemia. Light infections are usually left untreated in areas where reinfection is common. Iron supplements and a diet high in protein will speed the recovery process. In a case study involving 56-60 men with Trichuris trichiura and/or N. americanus infections, both albendazole and mebendazole were 90% effective in curing T. trichiura. However, albendazole had a 95% cure rate for N. americanus, while mebendazole only had a 21% cure rate. This suggests albendazole is most effective for treating both T. trichiura and N. americanus.

Cryotherapy by application of liquid nitrogen to the skin has been used to kill cutaneous larvae migrans, but the procedure has a low cure rate and a high incidence of pain and severe skin damage, so it now is passed over in favor of suitable pharmaceuticals. Topical application of some pharmaceuticals has merit, but requires repeated, persistent applications and is less effective than some systemic treatments.

During the 1910s, common treatments for hookworm included thymol, 2-naphthol, chloroform, gasoline, and eucalyptus oil. By the 1940s, the treatment of choice was tetrachloroethylene, given as 3 to 4 cc in the fasting state, followed by 30 to 45 g of sodium sulfate. Tetrachloroethylene was reported to have a cure rate of 80 percent for Necator infections, but 25 percent in Ancylostoma infections, and often produced mild intoxication in the patient.

== Epidemiology ==
Necator americanus was first discovered in Brazil and then was found in Texas. Later, it was found to be indigenous in Africa, China, southwest Pacific islands, India, and Southeast Asia. This parasite is a tropical parasite and is the most common species in humans. Roughly 95% of hookworms found in the southern region of the United States are N. americanus. This parasite is found in humans, but can also be found in pigs and dogs. Infections with Necator americanus have been historically reported in the Southern United States; in 1905 more than 40% of Southerners were infected; in the 1930’s a national survey reported 53-75% prevalence in some areas; 19.6% infection rates in Southern US and Appalachia in 1982 were documented. Research into this disease burden includes surveys and questionnaires, stool sample collection, and detection of parasite DNA. In 2017 infections were associated with poverty, with high prevalence reported in black residents of Lowndes County, Alabama. Social determinants of health contribute to this ongoing health inequity. In 2020, 69.8% of the population of Lowndes County, Alabama was labeled as black or African American compared to the national average in the same year of 12.1%

Transmission of N. americanus infection requires the deposition of egg-containing feces on shady, well-drained soil and is favored by warm, humid (tropical) conditions. Therefore, infections worldwide are usually reported in places where direct contact with contaminated soil occurs.

== See also ==
- Ancylostomiasis
