= Charles Wardell Stiles =

American parasitologist

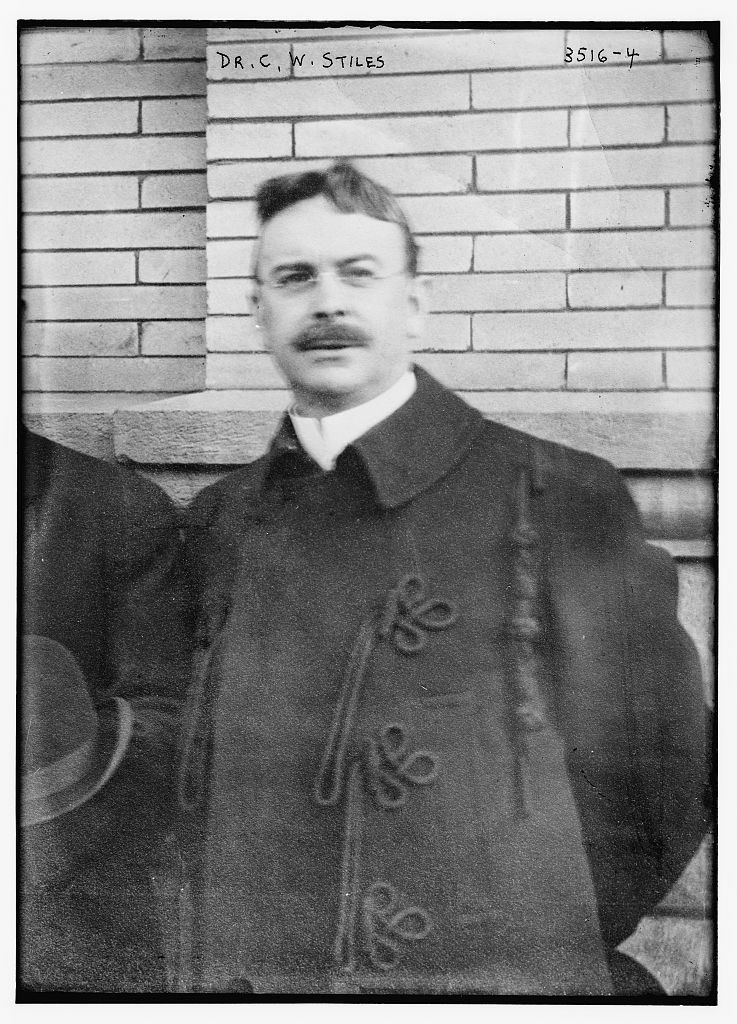

Charles Wardell Stiles (May 15, 1867 – January 24, 1941) was an American parasitologist born in Spring Valley, New York. He was notable for working on a campaign against hookworm infestation in the American South, where it had been found to cause high rates of anemia, a debilitating disease.

== Biography ==
He studied science at Wesleyan University in Connecticut (1885–86), Collège de France (1886–87), the University of Berlin (1887–89) and the University of Leipzig (1889–90). In 1891, he continued his education at the zoological station in Trieste and at the Institut Pasteur in Paris. He obtained his doctorate in Leipzig under the direction of parasitologist Rudolf Leuckart (1822–1898).

He taught classes in medical zoology at Johns Hopkins School of Medicine and at Georgetown University. He also worked as a zoologist at the Bureau of Animal Industry in the United States Department of Agriculture from 1891 to 1902, and was later chief zoologist at the Hygienic Laboratory of the US Public Health and Marine Hospital Service from 1902 to 1931. In 1898, Stiles was deployed to Germany as scientific ambassador on the BAI's behalf to investigate reports of trichinosis in American pork. The investigation concluded that the contemporary standard of microscopic examination of pork was insufficient for preventing the disease.

In addition, he helped establish the Rockefeller Sanitary Commission for the Eradication of Hookworm Disease. In 1921, Stiles was awarded the Public Welfare Medal from the National Academy of Sciences.

Stiles is remembered for his investigations of parasitic diseases such as trichinosis and hookworm. While working at the Department of Agriculture, he identified a new species of hookworm called Necator americanus ("American murderer") from samples brought from Puerto Rico by his former student, Bailey Ashford. In 1908, he diagnosed widespread hookworm infestation in the "dirt eaters" of the American South (eating dirt is a symptom of severe anemia). Through the journalist Walter Hines Page, this led to the creation of the Rockefeller Sanitary Commission (a forerunner of the Rockefeller Foundation) campaign for the eradication of hookworm, especially in the American South. He also dealt with health and sanitation issues that involved miners and cotton mill workers.

Stiles was secretary of the International Commission on Zoological Nomenclature, a group involved in setting standards for zoological classifications.

== Selected writings ==
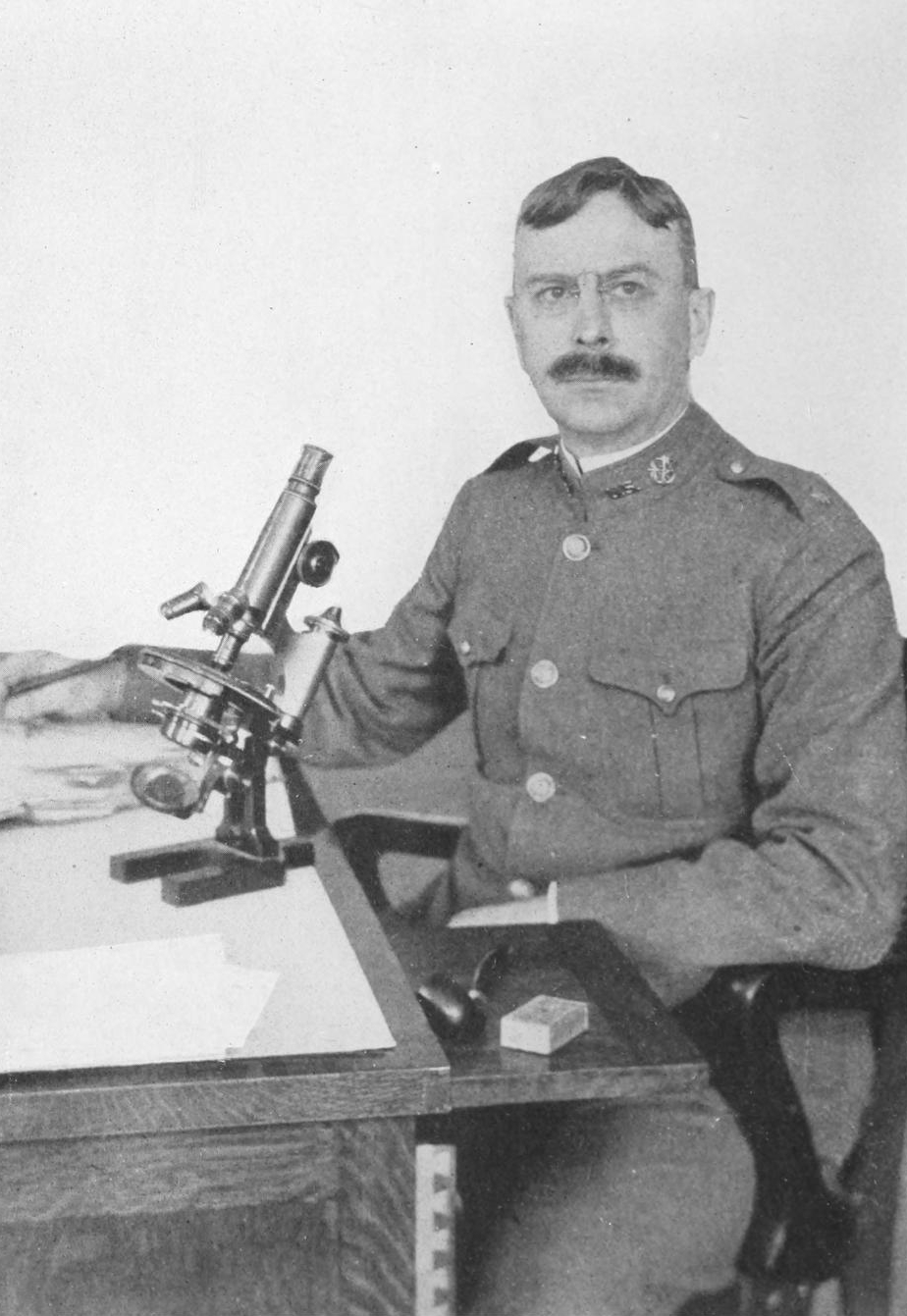
Portrait c. 1912

- "Trichinosis in Germany", 1901
- "Index-Catalog of Medical and Veterinary Zoology", (1902–20)
- "Report upon the prevalence and geographic distribution of hookworm disease (uncinariasis or anchylostomiasis) in the United States", 1903
- "A zoological investigation into the cause, transmission, and source of Rocky Mountain "spotted fever", 1905
- "A statistical study of the prevalence of intestinal worms in man", 1906
- "The Sanitary Privy: Its Purpose and Construction", 1910
- "Key-catalogue of the Protozoa reported for man", 1925
- "Key-catalogue of the worms reported for man", 1926
