= Anemia in pregnancy =

Condition due to low red blood cell count

Anemia is a condition in which blood has a lower-than-normal amount of red blood cells or hemoglobin. Anemia in pregnancy is a decrease in the total red blood cells (RBCs) or hemoglobin in the blood during pregnancy. Anemia is an extremely common condition in pregnancy world-wide, conferring a number of health risks to mother and child. While anemia in pregnancy may be pathologic, in normal pregnancies, the increase in RBC mass is smaller than the increase in plasma volume, leading to a mild decrease in hemoglobin concentration referred to as physiologic (or dilutional) anemia. Maternal signs and symptoms are usually non-specific, but can include: fatigue, pallor, dyspnea, palpitations, and dizziness. There are numerous well-known maternal consequences of anemia including: maternal cardiovascular strain, reduced physical and mental performance, reduced peripartum blood reserves, increased risk for peripartum blood product transfusion, and increased risk for maternal mortality.

== Signs and symptoms ==
Common symptoms are headache, fatigue, lethargy, tachycardia, tachypnea, paresthesia, pallor, glossitis and cheilitis. Severe symptoms include congestive heart failure, placenta previa, abruptio placenta, and operative delivery.

== Causes ==
=== Physiologic causes ===
Dilutional anemia: There is an increase in overall blood volume during pregnancy, and even though there is an increase in overall red blood cell mass, the increase in the other parts of the blood like plasma decrease the overall percentage of red blood cells in circulation.

=== Non-physiologic causes ===
Iron deficiency anemia: this can occur from the increased production of red blood cells, which requires a lot of iron and also from inadequate intake of iron, which increase in pregnancy.

Hemoglobinopathies: Thalassemia and sickle cell disease.

Dietary deficiencies: Folate deficiency and vitamin B12 deficiency are common causes of anemia in pregnancy. Folate deficiency occurs due to diets low in leafy green vegetables, and animal sources of protein. B12 deficiency tends to be more common in individuals with Crohn's disease or gastrectomies.

Cell membrane disorders: Hereditary spherocytosis

Autoimmune causes: lead to the hemolysis of red blood cells (Ex: autoimmune hemolytic anemia).

Hypothyroidism and chronic kidney disease

Parasitic infestations: some examples are hookworm or Plasmodium species

Bacterial or viral infections

Iron deficiency is the most common cause of anemia in the pregnant woman. During pregnancy, the average total iron requirement is about 1200 mg per day for a 55 kg woman. This iron is used for the increase in red cell mass, placental needs and fetal growth. About 40% of women start their pregnancy with low to absent iron stores and up to 90% have iron stores insufficient to meet the increased iron requirements during pregnancy and the postpartum period.

The majority of women presenting with postpartum anemia have pre-delivery iron deficiency anemia or iron deficiency anemia combined with acute blood loss during delivery.

== Adverse outcomes ==
=== Maternal outcomes ===
Studies have suggested that severe maternal morbidity (SMM) is increased approximately twofold in antepartum maternal anemia. SMM is defined by maternal death, eclampsia, transfusion, hysterectomy, or intensive care unit admission at delivery. Additional complications may include postpartum haemorrhage, preeclampsia, cesarean delivery, and infections.

=== Fetal outcomes ===
Iron deficiency during pregnancy is linked to a number of harmful effects on the fetus such as intrauterine growth restriction, death in utero, infection, preterm delivery and neurodevelopmental damage, which may be irreversible.

== Diagnosis ==
The most useful test with which to render a diagnosis of anemia is a low RBC count, however hemoglobin and hematocrit values are most commonly used in making the initial diagnosis of anemia. Testing involved in diagnosing anemia in pregnant women must be tailored to each individual patient. Suggested tests include: hemoglobin and hematocrit (ratio of red blood cells to the total blood volume), mean corpuscular volume (MCV), mean corpuscular hemoglobin (MCH), erythrocyte count (number of red blood cells in the blood), red cell distribution width (RDW), reticulocyte count, and a peripheral smear to assess red blood cell morphology. If iron deficiency is suspected, additional tests such as: serum iron, total iron-binding capacity (TIBC), transferrin saturation, and plasma or serum ferritin may be warranted. Reference ranges for these values are often not the same for pregnant women. Additionally, laboratory values for pregnancy often change throughout the duration of a woman's gestation. For example, the reference values for what level of hemoglobin is considered anemic varies in each trimester of pregnancy.

- First trimester hemoglobin < 11 g/dL

- Second trimester hemoglobin < 10.5 g/dL

- Third trimester hemoglobin < 11 g/dL

- Postpartum hemoglobin < 10 g/dL

Listed below are normal ranges for important lab values in the diagnosis of anemia. Keep in mind that these ranges might change based on each patient's stage in pregnancy:

- Hemoglobin: Men (13.6-16.9), women (11.9-14.8)

- Hematocrit: Men (40-50%), women (35-43%)

- MCV: 82.5 - 98

- Reticulocyte count: Men (16-130X10^3/microL or X10^9), Women (16-98/microL or X10^9)

Differential using MCV

MCV can be a great measure for differentiating between different forms of anemia. MCV measures the average size of your red blood cells. There are three cut off measurements for MCV. If the MCV is < 80fL it is considered microcytic. If the MCV is from 80 to 100 fL then it is considered a normocytic anemia. If the MCV is > 100 fL it is considered a macrocytic anemia. Some causes of anemia can be characterized by different ranges of MCV depending upon the severity disease. Here are common causes of anemia organized by MCV.

MCV < 80 fL

- Iron deficiency

- Thalassemia

- Anemia of chronic disease or anemia of inflammation

MCV 80 - 100 fL

- Iron deficiency

- Infection

- Hypothyroidism

- Liver disease or alcohol use

- Drug-induced

- Hemolysis

- Vitamin B12 or folate deficiency

MCV > 100 fL

- Vitamin B12 or folate deficiency

- Drug induced

- Liver disease or alcohol use

- Hypothyroidism

- Myelodysplastic Syndromes

=== Pregnancy ===
Pregnant women need almost twice as much iron as women who are not pregnant do. Not getting enough iron during pregnancy raises risk of premature birth or a low-birth-weight baby. Hormonal changes in the pregnant woman result in an increase in circulating blood volume to 100 mL/kg with a total blood volume of approximately 6000–7000 mL. While red cell mass increases by 15–20% during pregnancy, plasma volume increases by 40%. Hemoglobin levels less than 11 g/dL during the first trimester, less than 10.5 g/dL during the second and third trimesters and less than 10 mg/dL in the postpartum period are considered anemic.

== Prevention ==
Anemia is a very common complication of pregnancy. A mild form of anemia can be a result of dilution of blood. There is a relatively larger increase in blood plasma compared to total red cell mass in all pregnancies, which results in dilution of the blood and causes physiologic anemia . These changes take place to ensure adequate amount of blood is supplied to the fetus and prepares body for expected blood loss at the time of delivery.

=== Prevention of iron deficiency anemia ===
Iron deficiency is the most common cause of non-physiologic anemia. Iron deficiency anemia can be prevented with supplemental oral iron 27–30 mg daily. This dose typically corresponds to the amount of iron found in iron-containing prenatal vitamins. Consult with your medical provider to determine whether additional supplements are needed. Complete routine labs during pregnancy for early detection of iron deficiency anemia.

Iron deficiency anemia can also be prevented by eating iron-rich foods. This includes dark green leafy vegetables, eggs, meat, fish, dried beans, and fortified grains.

=== Prevention of other causes of anemia ===
This may be only applicable to select individuals.

Vitamin B12: Women who consume strictly vegan diets are advised to take Vitamin B12 supplements; this helps prevent anemia due to low Vitamin B12 levels.

Folic Acid: Folic acid supplement recommended for women with history of documented folate deficiency. Folic acid supplementation also recommended for prevention of neural tube defects in the fetus.

== Treatment ==
For treatment of iron deficiency anemia in pregnant women, iron supplementation at doses higher than prenatal supplements is recommended. The standard doses of oral iron ranges from 40 mg to 200 mg elemental iron daily. Consult with your medical provider to determine the exact dose needed for your condition, higher than needed doses of iron supplements may sometimes lead to more adverse effects.

Iron supplements are easy to take, however adverse effects in some cases may include gastrointestinal side effects, nausea, diarrhea, and/or constipation. In cases when oral iron supplement is not tolerable, other options include longer intervals between each oral dose, liquid iron supplements, or intravenous iron. Intravenous iron may also be used in cases of severe iron deficiency anemia during second and third trimesters of pregnancy.

Anemias due to other deficiencies such as folic acid or vitamin B12 can also be treated with supplementation as well; dose may vary based on level of deficiency.

Other forms of anemias, such as inherited or acquired anemias prior to pregnancy, will require continuous management during pregnancy as well.

Treatment should target the underlying disease or condition affecting the patient.

- The majority of obstetric anemia cases can be treated based on their etiology if diagnosed in time. Oral iron supplementation is the gold standard for the treatment of iron deficiency anemia and intravenous iron can be used when oral iron is not effective or tolerated from the second trimester of pregnancy onwards.
- Treatment of postpartum hemorrhage is multifactorial and includes medical management, surgical management along with blood product support.

=== Epidemiology ===
According to the WHO estimation, the global prevalence of anemia during pregnancy is over 40%, and the prevalence of anemia during pregnancy in North America is 6%. Prevalence of anemia in pregnancy is higher in developing countries compared to developed countries. 56% of pregnant women from low and middle income countries were reported to have anemia.

== Guidelines ==
1. Pavord, S; Myers, B; Robinson, S; Allard, S; Strong, J; Oppenheimer, C (Mar 2012). "UK guidelines on the management of iron deficiency in pregnancy". Br J Haematol. 156 (5): 588–600. doi:10.1111/j.1365-2141.2011.09012.x. PMID 2251200. S2CID 12588512.
2. Markova, V; Norgaard, A; Jorgensen, KJ; Langhoff-Roos, J (2015). "Treatment for women with postpartum iron deficiency anaemia". Cochrane Database Syst. Rev. 2015 (8) CD010861. doi:10.1002/14651858.CD010861.pub2. PMC 8741208. PMID 26270434.
3. Finkelstein JL, Cuthbert A, Weeks J, Venkatramanan S, Larvie DY, De-Regil LM, Garcia-Casal MN (August 2024). "Daily oral iron supplementation during pregnancy". The Cochrane Database of Systematic Reviews CD004736. doi:10.1002/14651858.CD004736.pub6. PMC 11325660. PMID 39145520.
4. Dahlke, JD; Mendez-Figueroa, H; Maggio, L; Hauspurg, AK; Sperling, JD; Chauhan, SP; Rouse, DJ (2015). "Prevention and management of postpartum hemorrhage: a comparison of 4 national guidelines". Am J Obstet Gynecol. 213 (1): 761–10. doi:10.1016/j.ajog.2015.02.023. PMID 25731692.
5. Shaylor, R; Weiniger, CF; Austin, N; Tzabazis, A; Shander, A; Goodnough, LT; Butwick, AJ (2017). "National and international guidelines for patient blood management in obstetrics: a qualitative review". Anesth Analg. 124 (1): 216–32. doi:10.1213/ANE.0000000000001473. PMC 5161642. PMID 27557476.
6. Tunçalp, Ő; Souza, JP; Gűlmezoglu, M (Dec 2013). "New WHO recommendations on prevention and treatment of postpartum hemorrhage". Int J Gynaecol Obstet. 123 (3): 254–6. doi:10.1016/j.ijgo.2013.06.024. PMID 24054054. S2CID 40664131.
