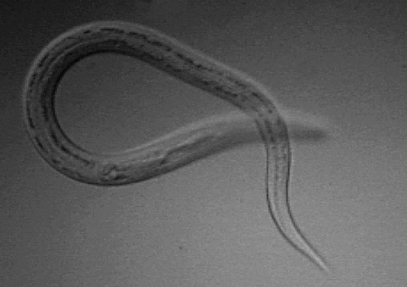
- Necator americanus

Scientific classification
- Kingdom: Animalia
- Phylum: Nematoda
- Class: Chromadorea
- Order: Rhabditida
- Family: Ancylostomatidae
- Genus: Necator; Stiles, 1903

Species
- Species include: Necator americanus

= Necator (nematode) =

Genus of roundworms

Necator is a genus of nematodes that includes some species of hookworms. Necator americanus causes necatoriasis.

== See also ==
- List of parasites (human)
