= Franz Ignaz Pruner =

German physician and anthropologist

Franz Ignaz Pruner Bey
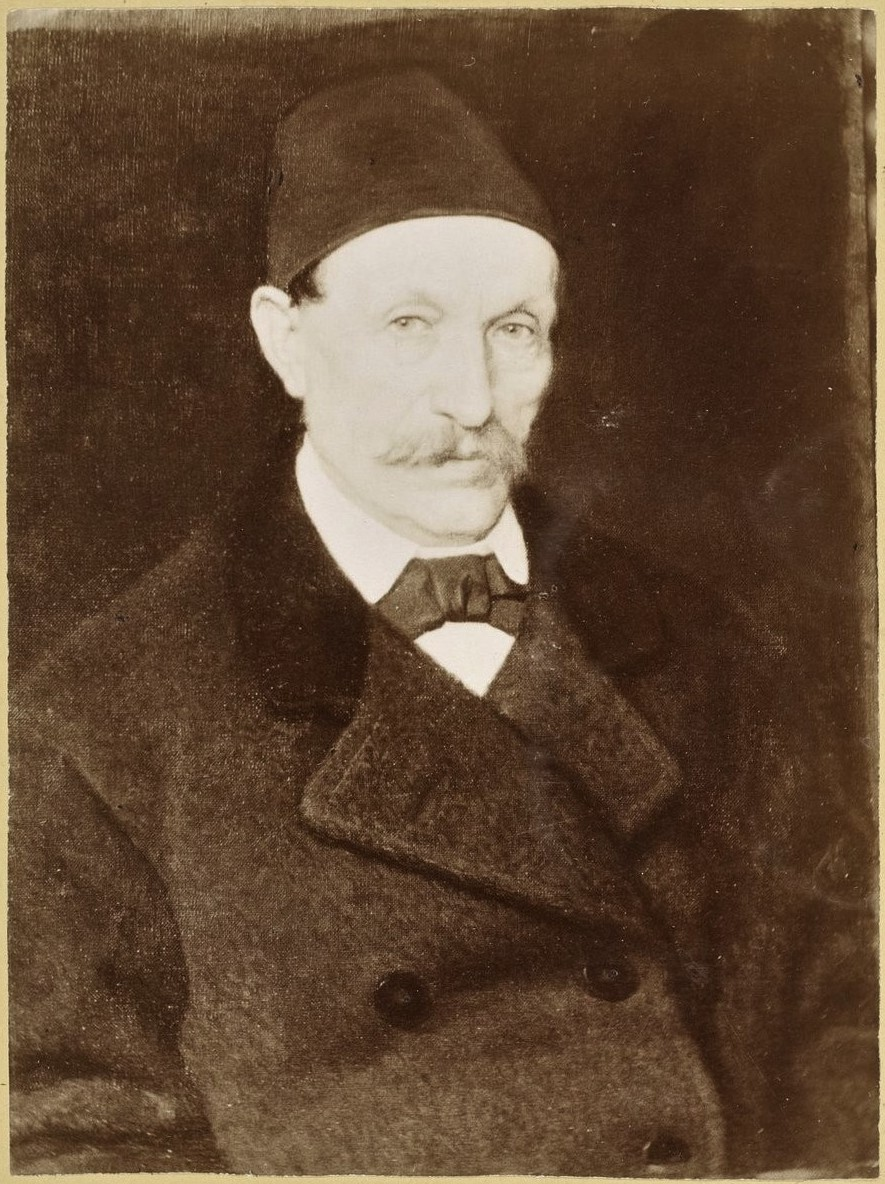
- Born: March 8, 1808; Pfreimd, Germany
- Died: September 29, 1882 (aged 74); Pisa, Italy

Franz Ignaz Pruner Bey (March 8, 1808 – September 29, 1882) was a German medical doctor and anthropologist.

== Life and career ==
Pruner was born on in Pfreimd, Kingdom of Bavaria, on March 8, 1808. His father was Ignace Brunner, a civil servant. His mother was Catherine Hochler, the daughter of a municipal councillor.

In 1826, Pruner entered the Ludwig-Maximilians-Universität München. He began studying medicine there the following year, where he became an assistant to Ernest von Grossi, a specialist in experimental medicine. In 1830, Pruner received a Doctor of Medicine.

In 1831, Pruner went to Paris, France, to continue studying medicine. There, he met French physician and psychiatrist Étienne Pariset. The same year, Pruner joined K. M. von Hügel on a trip traveling to India, Palestine, Syria, Egypt, and Greece, where they observed cholera and plague epidemics. In Jerusalem, they studied the treatment of leprosy.

In September 1831, Pruner was in Alexandria, Egypt. He was offered a position at the medical school at Abu Za’bal, where he became the chair of anatomy and physiology.

In 1832, Pruner returned to Munich, Germany.

In 1833, Pruner traveled to Malta and Italy. He studied ophthalmology in Pavia, Italy. The same year he returned to Egypt to become the director of a military hospital near Cairo.

In 1835, Pruner traveled to Mecca, Saudi Arabia, to help fight a cholera epidemic.

In 1836, he was appointed the director of military hospitals in Cairo. He was later named professor of ophthalmology at Cairo.

In 1849, Abbas I of Egypt made Pruner his personal physician, giving him the title Bey. He resigned from his position in 1860.

In 1865, Pruner served as president of the Société d'Anthropologie de Paris.

In 1872, Pruner moved to Pisa, Italy. He would live there for ten years before dying of an illness on September 29, 1882.
