= Griesinger =

Griesinger is a German surname. Notable people with the surname include:

- Georg August Griesinger (1769–1845), German diplomat and writer
- Jakob Griesinger (c. 1407 – 1491), German Dominican
- Wilhelm Griesinger (1817–1868), German neurologist and psychiatrist
- William Griesinger (1895–1978), Canadian politician
