= Ancylostomiasis =

- Other names: Anchylostomiasis, Ankylostomiasis
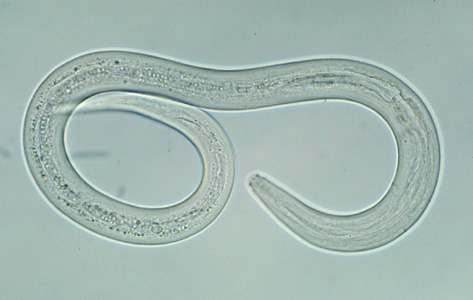
- Infective larva of Ancylostoma duodenale
- Specialty: Infectious diseases, parasitology

Ancylostomiasis is a hookworm disease caused by infection with Ancylostoma hookworms. The name is derived from Greek ancylos αγκύλος "crooked, bent" and stoma στόμα "mouth".

Ancylostomiasis is also known as miner's anaemia, tunnel disease, brickmaker's anaemia and Egyptian chlorosis. Helminthiasis may also refer to ancylostomiasis, but this term also refers to all other parasitic worm diseases as well. In the United Kingdom, if acquired in the context of working in a mine, the condition is eligible for Industrial Injuries Disability Benefit. It is a prescribed disease (B4) under the relevant legislation.§

Ancylostomiasis is caused when hookworms, present in large numbers, produce an iron deficiency anemia by sucking blood from the host's intestinal walls.

== Signs and symptoms ==
Depending on the organism, the signs and symptoms vary. Ancylostoma duodenale and Necator americanus can enter the blood stream and attach themselves to the walls of the small intestine to feed on the host's blood, causing a potentially severe anemia, while the larvae of other species of the genre such as Ancylostoma braziliensis and Ancylostoma caninum are able to do that only to canids and felids, their definitive hosts. Still, they're able to penetrate the human epidermis, causing usually self-limited skin infections known as Cutaneous larva migrans.

Signs and symptoms of intestinal parasitism have some similarities but vary between species, but infections by Ancylostoma duodenale usually have a faster onset and cause more blood loss per day per worm than those caused by Necator americanus. Other organs can be affected by these parasites, such as lungs, where the larvae mature from the L3 to the L4 stage, potentially causing cough and shortness of breath. The symptoms of infection by these worms are described with more detailed in their respective pages.

== Causes ==
The infection is usually contracted by people walking barefoot over contaminated soil. In penetrating the skin, the larvae may cause an allergic reaction. It is due to the itchy patch at the site of entry that the early infection gets its nickname "ground itch". Once larvae have broken through the skin, they enter the bloodstream and are carried to the lungs (however, unlike ascarids, hookworms do not usually cause pneumonia). The larvae migrate from the lungs up the windpipe to be swallowed and carried back down to the intestine. If humans come into contact with larvae of dog hookworms or cat hookworms, or of certain other hookworms that do not infect humans, the larvae may penetrate the skin. Sometimes, the larvae are unable to complete their migratory cycle in humans. Instead, the larvae migrate just below the skin producing snake-like markings. This is referred to as a creeping eruption or cutaneous larva migrans. However, Ancylostoma ceylanicum, a canid and felid hookworm, is able to establish patent intestinal infection in humans and is thus a zoonotic cause of ancylostomiasis.

== Diagnosis ==
The most common method for diagnosing hookworm infection is the microscopic identification of eggs in the stool, which have an elliptical or oval shape and a transparent capsule. The eggs from N. americanus and A. duodenale are visually identical, therefore treatment is initiated regardless of the causative species.

== Prevention ==
Control of this parasite should be directed against reducing the level of environmental contamination. Treatment of heavily infected individuals is one way to reduce the source of contamination (one study has estimated that 60% of the total worm burden resides in less than 10% of the population). Other obvious methods are to improve access to sanitation, e.g. toilets, but also convincing people to maintaining them in a clean, functional state, thereby making them conducive to use.

== Treatment ==
The first line drug of choice for the treatment of hookworm disease is albendazole, which is effective against all the species of hookworm (and against many other intestinal nematodes). The drug is very efficient, requiring only a single dose and is inexpensive. However, due to its low ability to enter systemic circulation, albendazole isn't able to kill larvae outside the intestines, which makes necessary the administration of a second dose, given around 20 days after the first one, in order to kill the that larvae that had not yet entered the intestines. Iron supplementation is necessary in some cases.

Mebendazole is the primary first-line alternative, sharing the same mechanism of action and properties of albendazole. Benzimidazoles and Ivermectin are also efficient. A blood transfusion may be necessary in severe cases of anemia. During the 1910s, common treatments for hookworm included thymol, 2-naphthol, chloroform, gasoline, and eucalyptus oil. By the 1940s, the treatment of choice was tetrachloroethylene, given as 3 to 4 cc in the fasting state, followed by 30 to 45 g of sodium sulfate. Tetrachloroethylene was reported to have a cure rate of 80 percent for Necator infections, but 25 percent in Ancylostoma infections, requiring re-treatment.

== Epidemiology ==
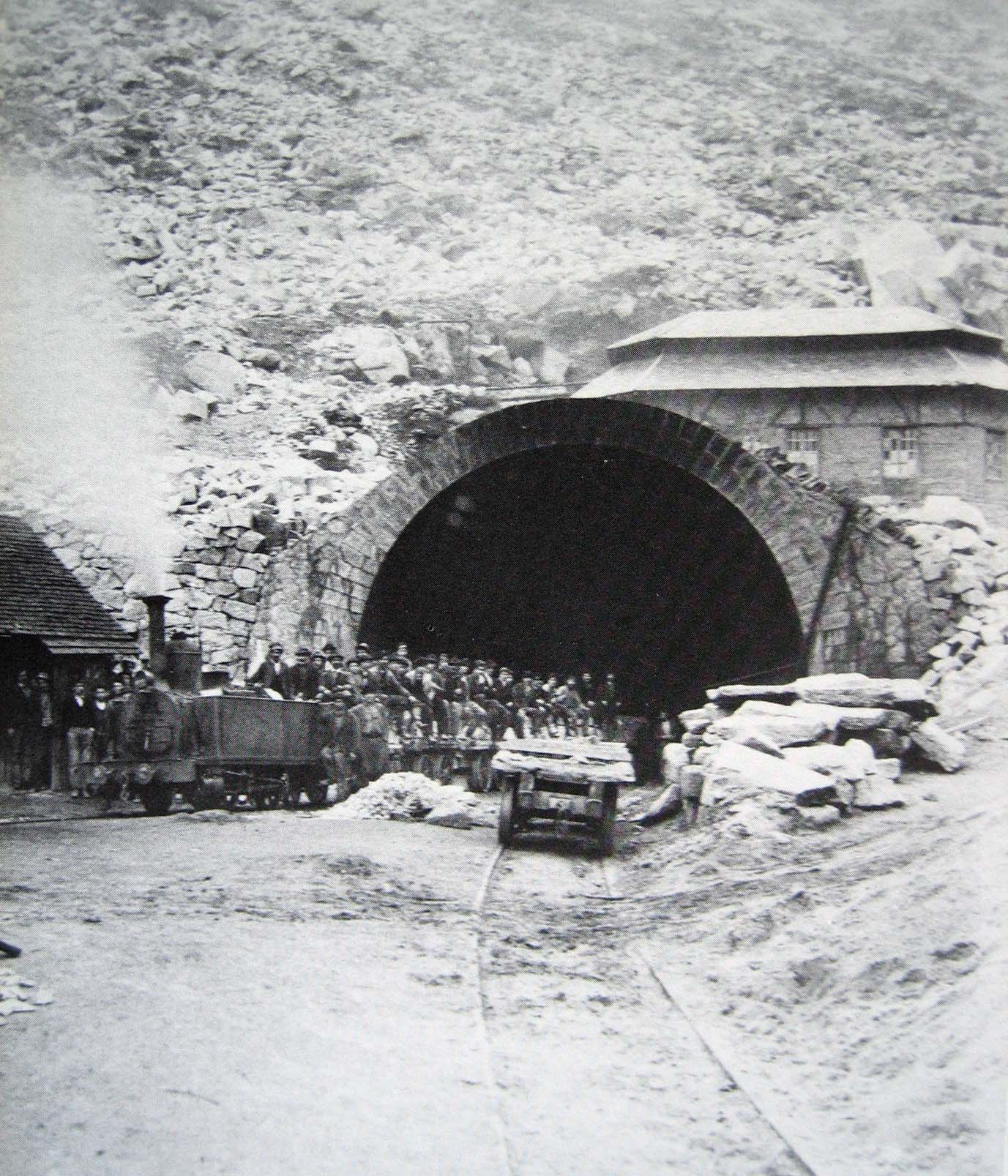
An epidemic of "miner's anaemia" caused by Ancylostoma duodenale among workers constructing the Gotthard Tunnel contributed to the understanding of ancylostomiasis.

Hookworm anaemia was first described by Wilhelm Griesenger in Egypt, Cairo in 1852. He found thousands of adult ancylostomes in the small bowel of a 20-year old soldier who was suffering from severe diarrhoea and anaemia (labelled at the time as Egyptian chlorosis). The subject was revisited in Europe when there was an outbreak of "miner's anaemia" in Italy. During the construction of the Gotthard Tunnel in Switzerland (1871–81), a large number of miners suffered from severe anaemia of unknown cause. Medical investigations let to the understanding that it was caused by Ancylostoma duodenale (favoured by high temperatures and humidity) and to "major advances in parasitology, by way of research into the aetiology, epidemiology and treatment of ancylostomiasis".

Hookworms still account for high proportion of debilitating disease in the tropics and 50–60,000 deaths per year can be attributed to this disease.

== See also ==
- Necatoriasis
