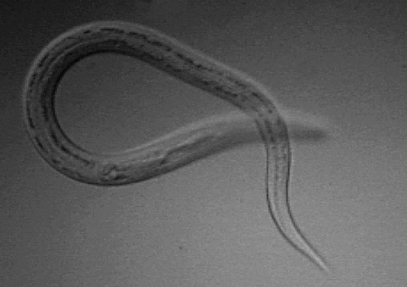
- L3-stage larva at 100-power magnification

Scientific classification
- Kingdom: Animalia
- Phylum: Nematoda
- Class: Chromadorea
- Order: Rhabditida
- Family: Ancylostomatidae
- Genus: Necator
- Species: N. americanus

Binomial name
- Necator americanus (Stiles, 1902)

Synonyms
- Uncinaria americanus Stiles, 1902

= Necator americanus =

Species of hookworm

Necator americanus is a species of hookworm (a type of helminth) commonly known as the New World hookworm. Like other hookworms, it is a member of the phylum Nematoda. It is an obligatory parasitic nematode that lives in the small intestine of human hosts. Necatoriasis—a type of helminthiasis—is the term for the condition of being host to an infestation of a species of Necator. Since N. americanus and Ancylostoma duodenale (also known as Old World hookworm) are the two species of hookworms that most commonly infest humans, they are usually dealt with under the collective heading of "hookworm infection". They differ most obviously in geographical distribution, structure of mouthparts, and relative size.

Necator americanus has been proposed as an alternative to Trichuris suis in helminthic therapy.

== Morphology ==
This parasite has two dorsal and two ventral cutting plates around the anterior margin of the buccal capsule. It also has a pair of subdorsal and a pair of subventral teeth located close to the rear. Males are usually 7–9 mm long, whereas females are about 9–11 mm long. The typical lifespan of these parasites is 3–5 years. They can produce between 5,000 and 10,000 eggs per day.

== Habitat ==
N. americanus is primarily found in tropical and temperate areas. This parasite thrives in warmer climates because to hatch, the eggs require a moist, warm, and shaded environment. The thin, smooth shells of this species cause the eggs and juveniles to die in freezing temperatures or with soil desiccation. Therefore, the type of soil where the parasite resides is also very important for their ideal living conditions. Ideal soil conditions tend to be in areas where water is able to drain at a standard pace, and the size of the soil particles is neither too large nor too small. That way, the degree of dampness, as well as the openings in the soil, allow the parasites to burrow to the surface and attach to the skin of their next host. High transmission rates seem to be congruent with the heavy rains and warm temperatures that are characteristic of tropical climates. One anomaly of this species is that it appears to prefer male hosts to female hosts, likely because of the division of labor in regions of its prevalence.

== Lifecycle ==
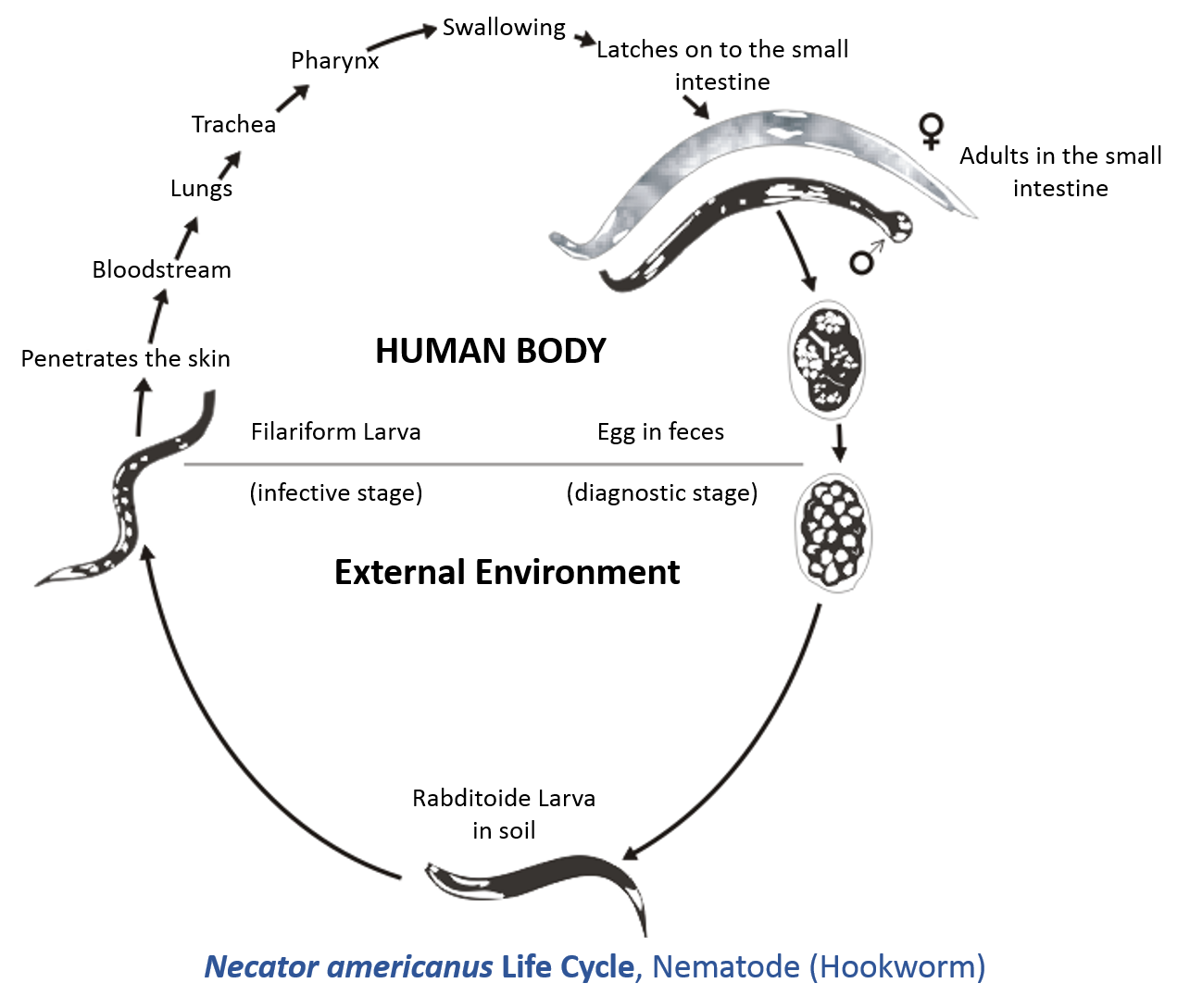
Life cycle of N. americanus inside and outside of the human body

This worm starts out as an unembryonated egg in the soil. After 24–48 hours under favorable conditions, the eggs become embryonated and hatch. This first juvenile stage 1 is known as 'rhabditiform'. The rhabditiform larvae grow and molt in the soil, transforming into a juvenile stage 2. The juvenile stage 2 molts once more until reaching the juvenile 3 stage, which is also called 'filariform'; this is also the infective form. The transformation from rhabditiform to the filariform usually takes 5–10 days. This larval form is able to penetrate human skin, travel through the blood vessels and heart, and reach the lungs. Once there, it burrows through the pulmonary alveoli and travels up the trachea, where it is swallowed and carried to the small intestine. There, it attaches to the intestinal wall, and matures into an adult and begins reproduction. Adults live in the lumen of the intestinal wall, where they cause blood loss to the host. The eggs produced by the adults end up on the soil after leaving the body through the feces; female hookworms produce up to 30,000 eggs per day. On average, most adult worms are eliminated in 1–2 years. The N. americanus lifecycle only differs slightly from that of A. duodenale. N. americanus has no development arrest in immune hosts and it must migrate through the lungs.

== Pathogenesis and symptoms ==
The pathology of N. americanus is divided into two stages – larvae and adults. The larvae penetrate the uninfected skin and travel through various organs, including the respiratory tract and lymph nodes. Once in the lymph nodes, the larvae start entering the blood, lungs, and intestines. Some larvae cannot readily enter the dermis and remain trapped in the skin, causing skin irritation and cutaneous larva migrans. Other symptoms include excessive coughing and dyspnea (short of breath) during larval migration. Once attached to the intestinal wall, N. americanus resides and matures into adults, penetrates blood vessels, and sucks blood. The incubation process of the larvae begins once entered into the small intestine; therefore, symptoms may not arise for up to 40 days, but this is variable from person to person. Blood loss from sites of intestinal attachment may cause iron-deficiency anemia and protein loss. One individual N. americanus can cause 30 μl of blood loss per day. Iron-deficiency anemia can cause intellectual disability and growth insufficiency in children. Further, infected patients experience abdominal pain (exacerbated by meals) with diarrhea, bloating, and nausea.

== Epidemiology ==
In the United States, 95% of human hookworm cases are caused by N. americanus, primarily in young school children in economically deprived rural areas. Historically, there have been high rates of infection among children in the American South. Juveniles cannot survive freezing temperatures, so the highest prevalence occurs in areas with warmer temperatures and greater rainfall. The greatest incidence of infections occurs in Asia and sub-Saharan Africa, especially in poverty-stricken areas with poor sanitation. A. duodenale infections occur at a lesser rate and are seen primarily in Europe and the Mediterranean.

== Genome ==
A draft assembly of the genome of Necator americanus has been sequenced and analyzed. It comprises 244 Mbp with 19,151 predicted protein-coding genes; these include genes whose products mediate the hookworm's invasion of the human host, genes involved in blood feeding and development, genes encoding proteins that represent new potential drug targets against hookworms, and expanded gene families encoding likely immunomodulator proteins, whose products may be beneficial in treating inflammatory diseases and asthma.

== Diagnostics ==
The most common method for diagnosing N. americanus is through identification of eggs in a fecal sample using a microscope. N. americanus eggs have a thin shell and are oval shaped, measuring roughly 56–74 by 36–40 μm.

== Treatments ==
The most common treatment for N. americanus infection are benzimidazoles, specifically albendazole and mebendazole. Benzimidazoles kill adult worms by binding to the nematode's β-tubulin and subsequently inhibiting microtubule polymerization within the parasite. The efficacy of single-dose treatments for hookworm infections were: 72% for albendazole, 15% for mebendazole, and 31% for pyrantel pamoate. A current concern with this parasite is the increase in drug resistance, such as benzimidazoles and mebendazoles.

Pregnant women should not be treated within their first trimester.

During the 1940s, the treatment of choice was tetrachloroethylene, given as 3 to 4 cc in the fasting state, followed by 30 to 45 g of sodium sulfate. Tetrachloroethylene was reported to have a cure rate of 80 percent for Necator infections, but 25 percent in Ancylostoma infections, and often produced mild intoxication in the patient.

== Prevention and control ==
Infection and transmission of others can be prevented by not defecating outdoors or using human feces as fertilizer. This parasite is not transmittable directly from person to person. Pigs may be an intermediate host for N. americanus.

== Economic burden ==
N. americanus causes hookworm diseases, which are associated with blood loss and anemia. Patients who are infected with around 25 to 100 worms experience symptoms such as fatigue, weight loss, and slight headaches. As the infestation number reaches 100 to 500 worms, the patient experiences extreme fatigue, iron deficiency, and abdominal pain. The symptoms worsen and result in possible death when the infestation reaches over 500 hookworms. Children and pregnant women affected by N. americanus are at greater risk due to anemia and the greater need for dietary iron and protein. The demand is high for an improvement of sanitation to reduce fecal contamination in regions with high prevalence of N. americanus infections. The current control strategies include a combination of mass drug administration for children at age 4–6 years to prevent or eliminate N. americanus infections.
