= Troglostrongylus =

Scientific classification
- Kingdom: Animalia
- Phylum: Nematoda
- Class: Chromadorea
- Order: Rhabditida
- Suborder: Strongylida
- Superfamily: Metastrongyloidea
- Family: Crenosomatidae
- Genus: Troglostrongylus; Vevers, 1923

Genus of roundworms

Troglostrongylus is a genus of nematodes which are metastrongyloid lung parasites of domestic cats (Felis catus) and small wild cats (Felis lybica, Lynx rufus, Lynx canadensis and Felis chaus) through the Middle East and North America.

Species of Trichostrongylus which have been recognised in felidae include T. subcrenatus, T. wilsoni, and T. brevoir.
