= Schulzia =

Schulzia may refer to:

- Schulzia (nematode), a genus of nematodes in the family Molineidae
- Schulzia (plant), a genus of plants in the family Apiaceae
