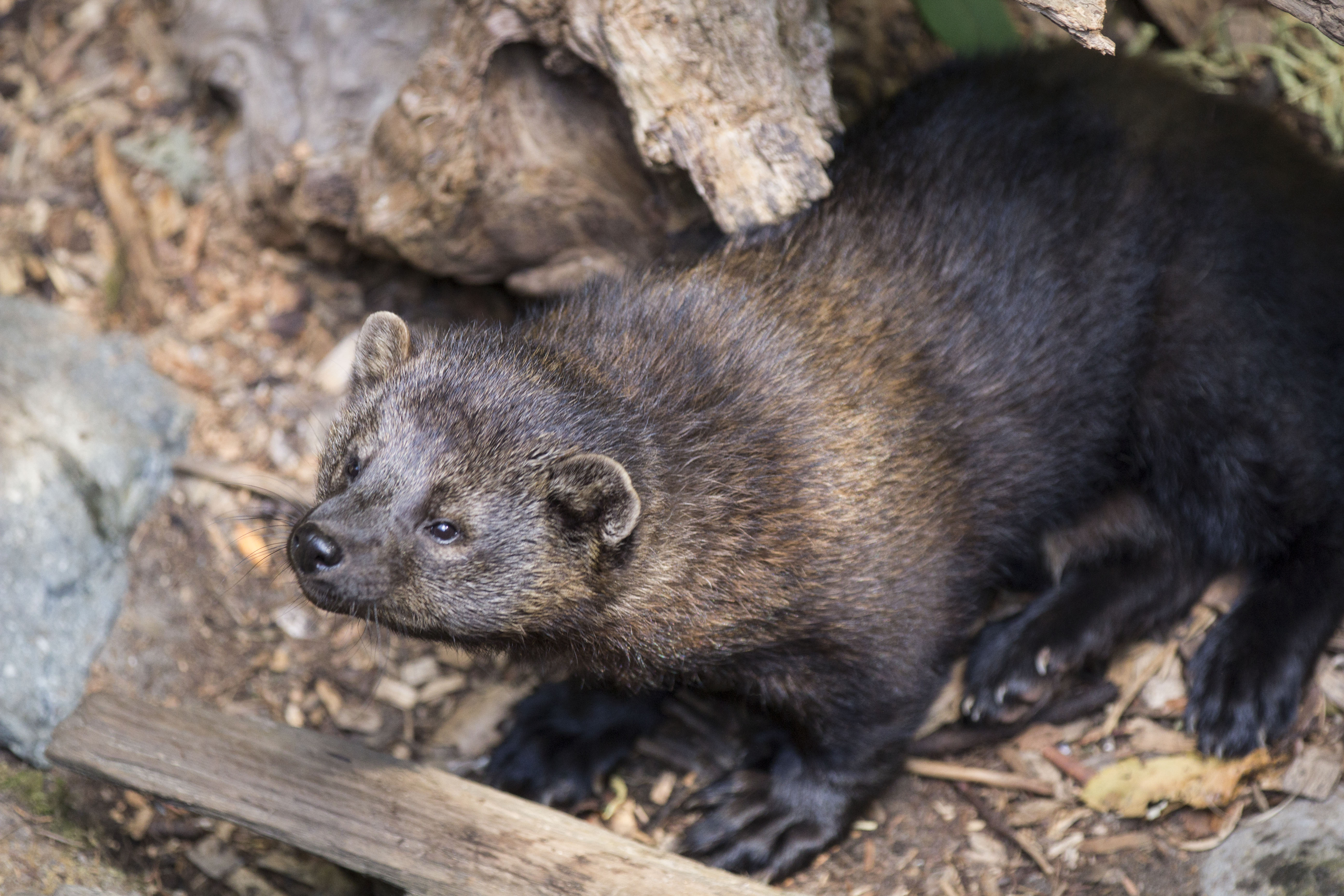
- A fisher in Washington

Conservation status
- Least Concern (IUCN 3.1)

- Secure (NatureServe)

Scientific classification
- Kingdom: Animalia
- Phylum: Chordata
- Class: Mammalia
- Order: Carnivora
- Family: Mustelidae
- Subfamily: Guloninae
- Genus: Pekania
- Species: P. pennanti

Binomial name
- Pekania pennanti (Erxleben, 1777)
- Fisher distribution map

Synonyms
- List: Mustela pennantii Erxleben, 1777; Mustela canadensis Schreber, 1788; Mustela melanorhyncha Boddaert, 1784; Mustela zibellina nigra Kerr, 1792; Viverra piscator Shaw, 1800; Viverra canadensis Shaw, 1800; Mustela nigra Turton, 1802; Mustela piscatoria Lesson, 1827; Martes pennantii Smith, 1843; Martes pennanti Coues, 1877

= Fisher (animal) =

Species of small, carnivorous mammal native to North America

The fisher (Pekania pennanti) is a carnivorous mammal native to North America, a forest-dwelling creature whose range covers much of the boreal forest in Canada to the northern United States. It is a member of the mustelid family and is the only living member of the genus Pekania. Although it is sometimes referred to colloquially as a fisher cat, it is not a feline.

The fisher is similar to, but larger than, the American marten (Martes americana) and Pacific marten (Martes caurina). In some regions, the fisher is known as a pekan, derived from its name in the Abenaki language, or wejack, an Algonquian word (cf. Cree ocêk, Ojibwa ojiig) borrowed by fur traders. Other Indigenous names for the fisher are Chipewyan thacho and Carrier chunihcho, both meaning "big marten", and Wabanaki uskool.

Fishers have few predators besides humans. They have been trapped since the 18th century for their fur. Their pelts were in such demand that they became locally extinct in several parts of the United States in the early part of the 20th century. Conservation and protection measures have allowed the species to rebound, but their current range is still reduced from its historical limits. In the 1920s, when pelt prices were high, some fur farmers attempted to raise fishers. However, their unusual delayed reproduction made breeding difficult. When pelt prices fell in the late 1940s, most fisher farming ended. While fishers usually avoid human contact, encroachments into forest habitats have resulted in some conflicts.

Male and female fishers look similar, but can be differentiated by size, with males being up to twice as large as the females. The fur of the fisher varies seasonally, being denser and glossier in the winter. During the summer, the color becomes more mottled, as the fur goes through a moulting cycle. The fisher prefers to hunt in the full forest. Although an agile climber, it spends most of its time on the forest floor, where it prefers to forage around fallen trees. An omnivore, it feeds on a wide variety of small animals and occasionally on fruits and mushrooms. It prefers the snowshoe hare and is one of the few animals able to prey successfully on porcupines. Despite its common name, it rarely eats fish. The reproductive cycle lasts almost a year. Female fishers give birth to a litter of three or four kits in the spring. They nurse and care for them until late summer, when they are old enough to set out on their own. Females enter estrus shortly after giving birth and leave the den to find a mate. Implantation of the blastocyst is delayed until the following spring, when they give birth and the cycle is renewed.

== Etymology ==
Despite the name "fisher", the animal is not known to eat fish. The name is instead related to the word "fitch", meaning a European polecat (Mustela putorius) or pelt thereof, due to the resemblance to that animal. The name comes from colonial Dutch equivalent fisse or visse. In the French language, the pelt of a polecat is also called fiche or fichet. Alternatively, Dr. James DeKay, as reported by John James Audubon and John Bachman, claimed the name "fisher" may have been attributed to the animal's "singular fondness for the fish used to bait traps", although this may have been local lore.

== Taxonomy ==
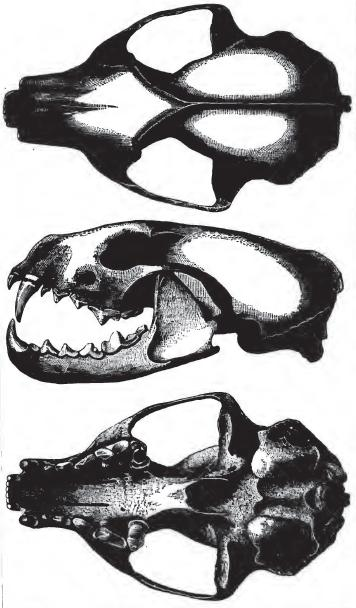
Skull diagram

The Latin specific name pennanti honors Thomas Pennant, who described the fisher in 1771. Buffon had first described the creature in 1765, calling it a pekan. Pennant examined the same specimen, but called it a fisher, unaware of Buffon's earlier description. Other 18th-century scientists gave it similar names, such as Schreber, who named it Mustela canadensis, and Boddaert, who named it Mustela melanorhyncha. The fisher was eventually placed in the genus Martes by Smith in 1843. In 2008, advances in DNA analysis allowed a more detailed study of the fisher's evolutionary history. The fisher and the genus Martes were determined to have descended from a common ancestor, but the fisher was distinct enough to put it in its own genus. It was decided to create the genus Pekania and reclassify the fisher as Pekania pennanti.

Members of the genus Pekania are distinguished by their four premolar teeth on the upper and lower jaws. Its close relative Mustela has just three. The fisher has 38 teeth. The dentition formula is: 3.1.4.12.1.4.2

=== Evolution ===
Some evidence shows that ancestors of the fisher migrated to North America during the Pliocene era between 2.5 and 5.0 million years ago. Two extinct mustelids, Pekania palaeosinensis and P. anderssoni, have been found in eastern Asia. The first true fisher, P. diluviana, has only been found in Middle Pleistocene North America. P. diluviana is strongly indicated to be related to the Asian finds, which suggests a migration. P. pennanti has been found as early as the Late Pleistocene era, about 125,000 years ago. No major differences are seen between the Pleistocene and the modern fishers. Fossil evidence indicates that the fisher's range extended farther south than it does today.

Three subspecies were identified by Goldman in 1935, Martes pennanti columbiana, M. p. pacifica, and M. p. pennanti. Later research has debated whether these subspecies could be positively identified. In 1959, E.M. Hagmeier concluded that the subspecies are not separable based on either fur or skull characteristics. Although some debate still exists, in general, the fisher is recognized to be a monotypic species with no extant subspecies.

== Physical characteristics ==
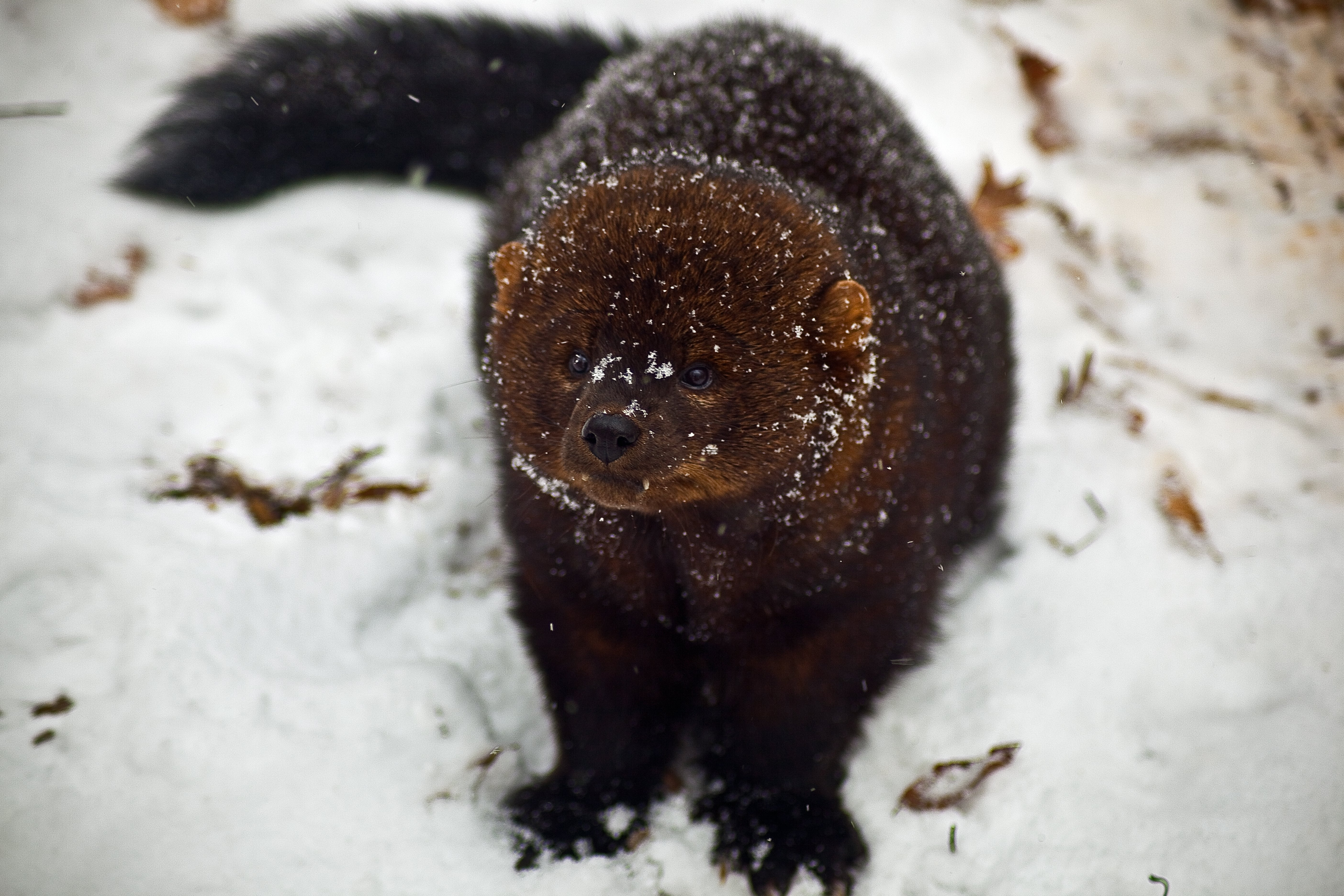
Fisher in winter coat

A fisher walking in snow

Fishers' bodies are long, thin, and low to the ground. The sexes have similar physical features, but they are sexually dimorphic, with the male being much larger than the female. Males are 90–120 cm (35–47 in) in total length and weigh 3.5–6.0 kg (8–13 lb). Females measure 75–95 cm (30–37 in) and weigh 2.0–2.5 kg (4–6 lb). Head and body lengths for both sexes range from 47–75 cm (19–30 in); the tail adding a further 30–42 cm (12–17 in). The largest male fisher ever recorded weighed 9 kg (20 lb).

The fisher's fur changes with the season and differs slightly between sexes. Males have coarser coats than females. In the early winter, the coats are dense and glossy, ranging from 30 mm (1 in) on the chest to 70 mm (3 in) on the back. The color ranges from deep brown to black, although it appears to be much blacker in the winter when contrasted with white snow. From the face to the shoulders, fur can be hoary-gold or silver due to tricolored guard hairs. The underside of a fisher is almost completely brown except for randomly placed patches of white- or cream-colored fur. In the summer, the fur color is more variable and may lighten considerably. Fishers undergo moulting starting in late summer and finishing by November or December.

Fishers have five toes on each foot, with unsheathed, retractable claws. Their feet are large, making movement on top of snowpacks easier. In addition to the toes, four central pads are on each foot. On the hind paws are coarse hairs that grow between the pads and the toes, giving them added traction when walking on slippery surfaces. Fishers have highly mobile ankle joints that can rotate their hind paws almost 180°, allowing them to maneuver well in trees and climb down head-first. The fisher is one of relatively few mammalian species with the ability to descend trees head-first.

A circular patch of hair on the central pad of their hind paws marks plantar glands that give off a distinctive odor. Since these patches become enlarged during breeding season, they are likely used to make a scent trail to allow fishers to find each other so they can mate.

== Biology and behavior ==
=== Hunting and diet ===
Fishers are generalist predators. Although their primary prey is snowshoe hares and porcupines, they are also known to supplement their diet with insects, nuts, berries, and mushrooms. They have been observed eating small apples during winter. Since they are solitary hunters, their choice of prey is limited by their size. Analyses of stomach contents and scat have found evidence of birds, small mammals, and even deer—the latter indicating that they are not averse to eating carrion. While the behavior is not common, fishers have been known to kill larger animals, such as wild turkey, raccoon, fox, marten, mink, otter, bobcat, and Canada lynx. Raccoons may be killed by a large fisher in trees or on the ground. Fishers can also catch martens on the ground or in the trees, and usually there is either a good population of fisher or marten but not both. Researchers in Maine have found "about a dozen" cases of confirmed fisher predation on Canada lynx, and several more suspected cases, in a four-township area of Maine. According to Maine Department of Inland Fisheries and Wildlife wildlife biologist Scott McClellan, the fishers involved in these kills attacked lynx bedded down in snowstorms with a quick "powerful grip" bite to the lynx's neck. Signs of struggle indicated that some lynx attempted to defend themselves but McClellan states that "the fishers would finish the cats off pretty quickly. There was some struggle certainly, but it didn't appear to last very long. There were some broken branches, tufts of fur, and claw marks where the lynx was trying to get away." The McClellan study in The Journal of Wildlife Management documents 14 fisher-caused mortalities of Canada lynx from 1999 to 2011 in northern Maine, and found that predation was the leading source of mortality of lynx in the study area (18 deaths, 14 by fisher).

Fishers are one of the few predators that seek out and kill porcupines. Stories in popular literature indicate that fishers can flip a porcupine onto its back and "scoop out its belly like a ripe melon". This was identified as an exaggerated misconception as early as 1966. Observational studies show that fishers make repeated biting attacks on the face of a porcupine and kill it after about 25–30 minutes.

=== Reproduction ===
The female fisher begins to breed at about one year of age and her reproductive cycle is an almost year-long event. Mating takes place in late March to early April. Blastocyst implantation is then delayed for ten months until mid-February of the following year when active pregnancy begins. After gestating for about 50 days, the female gives birth to one to four kits. The female then enters estrus 7–10 days later and the breeding cycle begins again.

Females den in hollow trees. Kits are born blind, helpless, and are partially covered with fine hair. Kits begin to crawl after about three weeks. After about seven weeks, they open their eyes. They start to climb after eight weeks. Kits are completely dependent on their mother's milk for the first eight to ten weeks, after which they begin to switch to a solid diet. After four months, kits become intolerant of their litter mates, and at five months, the mother pushes them out on their own. After one year, juveniles will have established their own range.

=== Social structure and home range ===
Fishers are generally crepuscular, being most active at dawn and dusk. They are active year-round, and are solitary, associating with other fishers only for mating. Males become more active during mating season. Females are least active during pregnancy and gradually increase activity after birth of their kits.

A fisher's hunting range varies from 6.6 km^{2} (3 sq mi) in the summer to 14.1 km^{2} (5 sq mi) in the winter. Ranges up to 20.0 km^{2} (8 sq mi) in the winter are possible depending on the quality of the habitat. Male and female fishers have overlapping territories. This behavior is imposed on females by males due to dominance in size and a male's desire to increase mating success.

=== Predators and parasites ===
As far as is known, adult fishers are not regularly subject to predation. Predators of the fisher include bears (Ursus spp), coyotes (Canis latrans), golden eagles (Aquila chrysaetos), bald eagles (Haliaeetus leucocephalus), lynxes (Lynx sp.), mountain lions (Puma concolor), wolverines (Gulo gulo), and possibly great horned owls (Bubo virginianus).

Parasites of fishers include nematode Baylisascaris devosi, tapeworm Taenia sibirica, nematode Physaloptera sp., trematodes Alaria mustelae and Metorchis conjunctus, nematode Trichinella spiralis, and Molineus sp.

== Habitat ==
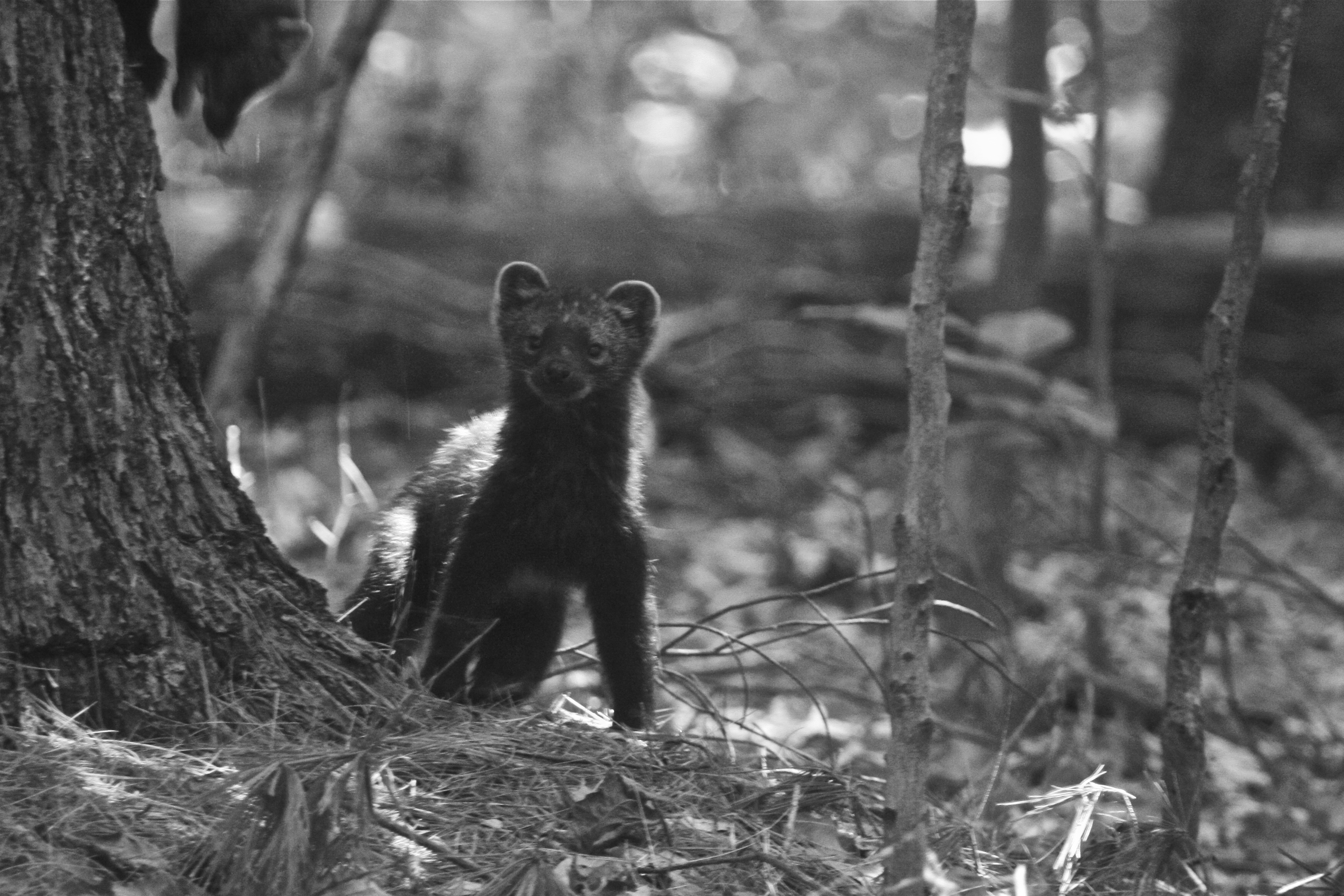
A fisher in the woods in Topsfield, Massachusetts

Although fishers are competent tree climbers, they spend most of their time on the forest floor and prefer continuous forest to other habitats. They have been found in extensive conifer forests typical of the boreal forest, but are also common in mixed-hardwood and conifer forests. Fishers prefer areas with continuous overhead cover with greater than 80% coverage and avoid areas with less than 50% coverage. Fishers are more likely to be found in old-growth forests. Since female fishers require moderately large trees for denning, forests that have been heavily logged and have extensive second growth appear to be unsuitable for their needs.

Fishers also select for forest floors with large amounts of coarse woody debris. In western forests, where fire regularly removes understory debris, fishers show a preference for riparian woodland habitat. Fishers tend to avoid areas with deep snow. Habitat is also affected by snow compaction and moisture content.

== Distribution ==
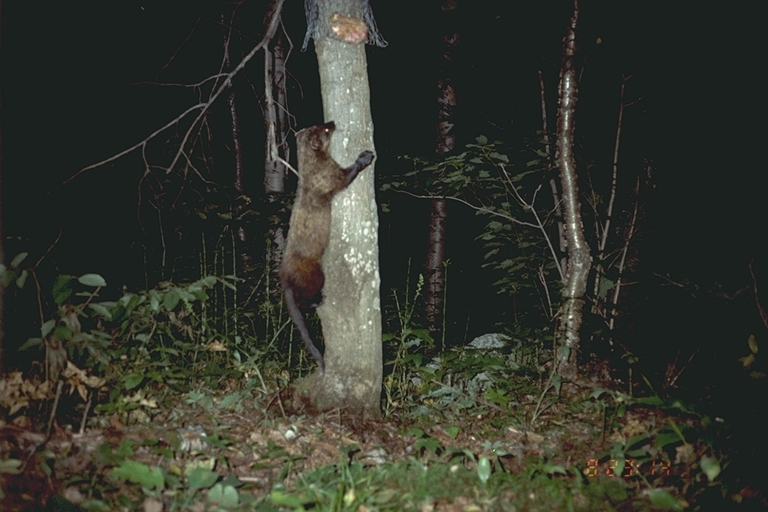
A fisher climbing a tree at night

Fishers are widespread throughout the northern forests of North America. They are present in the boreal and mixed deciduous-coniferous forest belt that runs across Canada from Nova Scotia in the east to the Pacific shore of British Columbia and north to Alaska. They are present as far north as Great Slave Lake in the Northwest Territories and as far south as the mountains of Oregon. Isolated populations occur in the Sierra Nevada of California, throughout New England, in the Catskill mountains of New York and the Appalachian Mountains of Pennsylvania, Maryland, West Virginia, and Virginia.

In the late 19th and early 20th centuries, fishers were virtually eliminated from the southern and eastern parts of their range, including most American states and eastern Canada including Nova Scotia. Overtrapping and loss of forest habitat were the reasons for the decline.

Most states had placed restrictions on fisher trapping by the 1930s, coincidental with the end of the logging boom. A combination of forest regrowth in abandoned farmlands and improved forest management practices increased available habitat and allowed remnant populations to recover. Populations have since recovered sufficiently that the species is no longer endangered. Increasing forest cover in eastern North America means that fisher populations will remain sufficiently robust for the near future. Between 1955 and 1985, some states had allowed limited trapping to resume. In areas where fishers were eliminated, porcupine populations subsequently increased. Areas with a high density of porcupines were found to have extensive damage to timber crops. In these cases, fishers were reintroduced by releasing adults relocated from other places into the forest. Once the fisher populations became re-established, porcupine numbers returned to natural levels. In Washington, fisher sightings were reported into the 1980s, but an extensive survey in the 1990s did not locate any.

Scattered fisher populations now exist in the Pacific Northwest. In 1961, fishers from British Columbia and Minnesota were reintroduced in Oregon to the southern Cascades near Klamath Falls and to the Wallowa Mountains near La Grande. From 1977 to 1980, fishers were introduced to the region around Crater Lake. Starting in January 2008, fishers were reintroduced into Washington State. The initial reintroduction was on the Olympic peninsula (90 animals), with subsequent reintroductions into the south Cascade Mountains. The reintroduced animals are monitored by radio collars and remote cameras, and have been shown to be reproducing. From 2008 to 2011, about 40 fishers were reintroduced in the northern Sierra Nevada near Stirling City, complementing fisher populations in Yosemite National Park and along California's northern boundary between the Pacific Coast Ranges and the Klamath Mountains. Fishers are a protected species in Oregon, Washington, and Wyoming. In Idaho and California, fishers are protected through a closed trapping season, but they are not afforded any specific protection; however, in California the fisher has been granted threatened status under the Endangered Species Act. In June 2011, the U.S. Fish and Wildlife Service recommended that fishers be removed from the endangered list in Idaho, Montana, and Wyoming.

Recent studies, as well as anecdotal evidence, show that fishers have begun making inroads into suburban backyards, farmland, and periurban areas in several US states and eastern Canada, as far south as most of northern Massachusetts, New York, Connecticut, Minnesota and Iowa, and even northwestern New Jersey. Having virtually disappeared after the construction of the Cape Cod Canal in the early 1900s, some reports have shown that populations have become re-established on Cape Cod, although the populations are likely smaller than the populations in the western part of New England.

== Relationship with humans ==
Fishers have had a long history of contact with humans, but most of it has been to the detriment of fisher populations. Unprovoked attacks on humans are extremely rare, but fishers will attack if they feel threatened or cornered. In one case, a fisher was blamed for an attack on a six-year-old boy. In another case, a fisher is believed to be responsible for an attack on a 12-year-old boy.

=== Fur trade and conservation ===
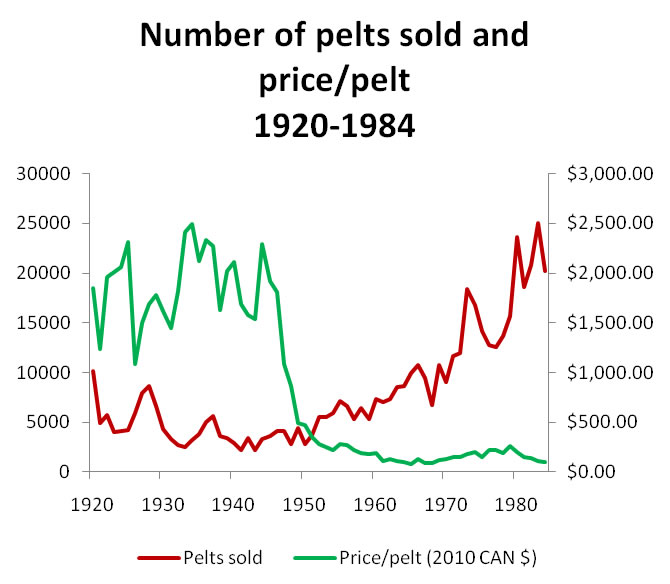
Fisher pelts sold: 1920–1984

Fishers have been trapped since the 18th century. They have been popular with trappers due to the value of their fur, which has been used for scarves and neck pieces.

The best pelts are from winter trapping, with secondary-quality pelts from spring trapping. The lowest-quality furs come from out-of-season trapping when fishers are moulting. They are easily trapped, and the value of their fur was a particular incentive for catching this species.

Prices for pelts have varied considerably over the past 100 years. They were highest in the 1920s and 1930s, when average prices were about US$100. In 1936, pelts were being offered for sale in New York City for $450–750 per pelt. Prices declined through the 1960s, but picked up again in the late 1970s. In 1979, the Hudson's Bay Company paid $410 for one female pelt. In 1999, 16,638 pelts were sold in Canada for C$449,307 at an average price of $27.

Between 1900 and 1940, fishers were threatened with near extinction in the southern part of their range due to overtrapping and alterations to their habitat. In New England, fishers, along with most other furbearers, were nearly exterminated due to unregulated trapping. Fishers became extirpated in many northern U.S. states after 1930, but were still abundant enough in Canada to maintain a harvest over 3,000 fishers per year. Limited protection was afforded in the early 20th century, but total protection was not given to the few remaining fishers until 1934. Closed seasons, habitat recovery, and reintroductions have restored fishers to much of their original range.

Trapping resumed in the U.S. after 1962, once numbers had recovered sufficiently. During the early 1970s, the value of fisher pelts soared, leading to another population crash in 1976. After a few years of closed seasons, fisher trapping reopened in 1979 with a shortened season and restricted bag limits. The population has steadily increased since then, with steadily increasing numbers of trapped animals, despite a much lower pelt value.

=== Captivity ===
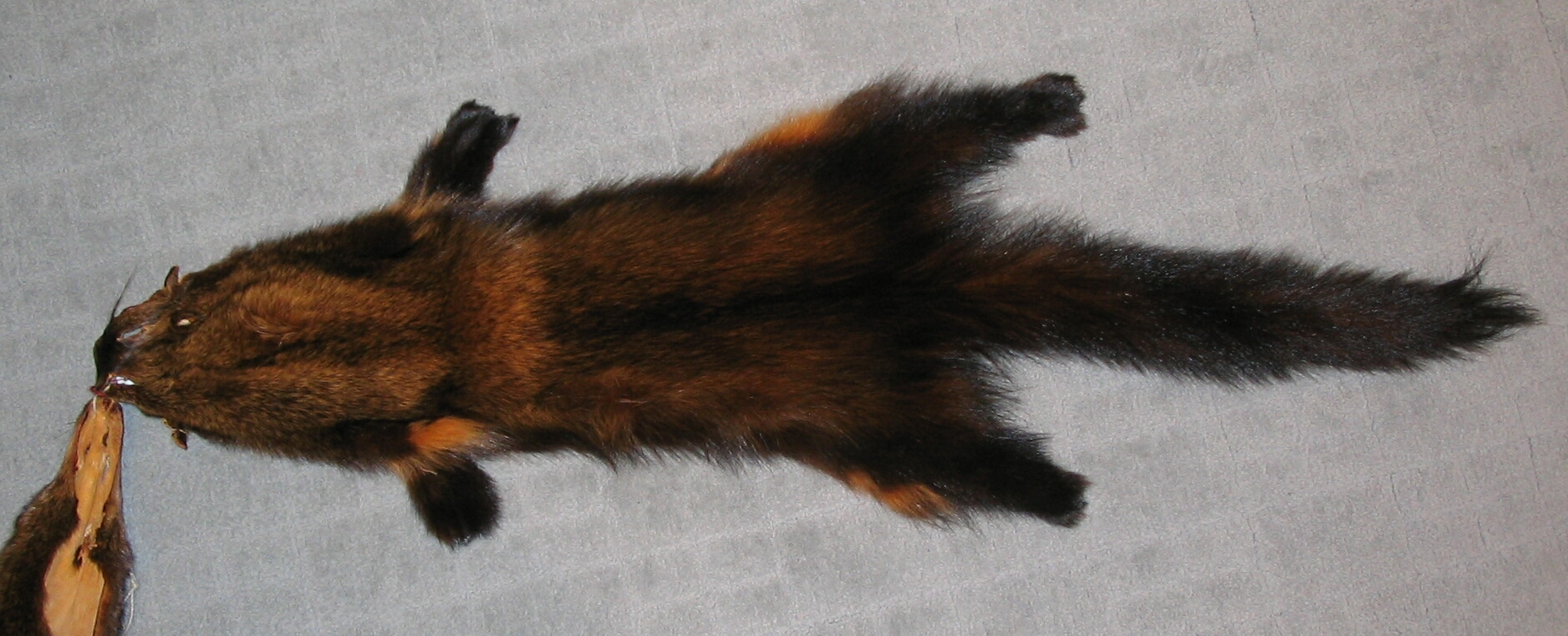
Fisher fur pelt (dyed)

Fishers have been captured live for fur farming, zoo specimens, and scientific research. From 1920–1946, pelt prices averaged about C$137. Since pelts were relatively valuable, attempts were made to raise fishers on farms. Fur farming was popular with other species such as mink and ermine, so the same techniques were thought to be applicable to fishers. However, farmers found it difficult to raise fishers due to their unusual reproductive cycle. In general, knowledge of delayed implantation in fishers was unknown at the time. Farmers noted that females mated in the spring but did not give birth. Due to declining pelt prices, most fisher farms closed operations by the late 1940s.

Fishers have also been captured and bred by zoos, but they are not a common zoo species. Fishers are poor animals to exhibit because, in general, they hide from visitors all day. Some zoos have had difficulty keeping fishers alive since they are susceptible to many diseases in captivity. Yet at least one example shows a fisher kept in captivity that lived to be 10 years old, and another living to be about 14 years old, well beyond its natural lifespan of 7 years.

In 1974, R.A. Powell raised two fisher kits for the purpose of performing scientific research. His primary interest was an attempt to measure the activity of fishers to determine how much food the animals required to function. He did this by running them through treadmill exercises that simulated activity in the wild. He compared this to their food intake and used the data to estimate daily food requirements. The research lasted for two years. After one year, one of the fishers died due to unknown causes. The second was released back into the wilderness of Michigan's Upper Peninsula.

=== Interactions with domestic animals ===
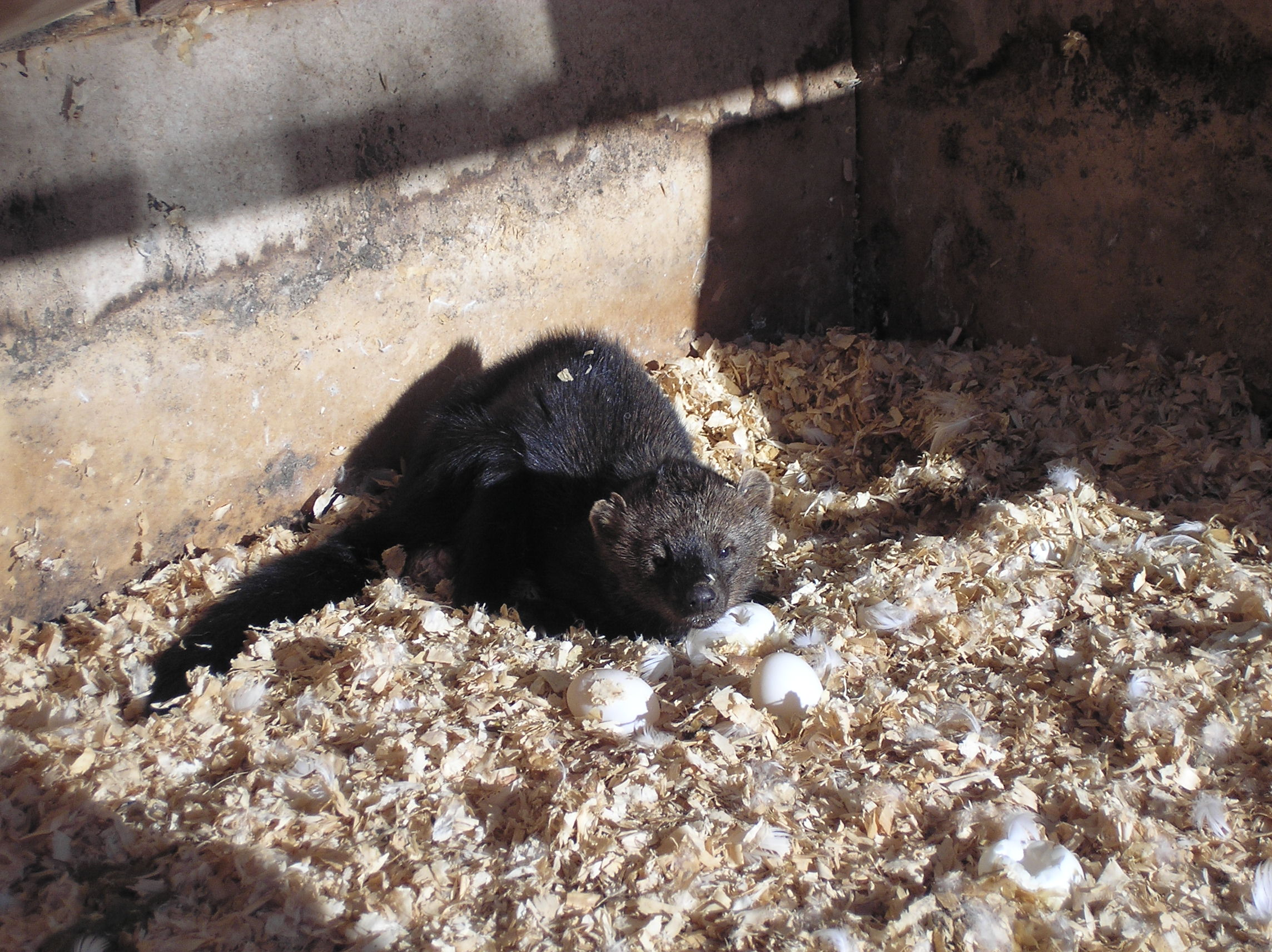
Fisher raiding a farmer's duck coop

In some areas, fishers can become pests to farmers when they raid chicken coops, and instances of fishers preying on cats and small dogs have been reported. However, a 1979 study examined the stomach contents of all fishers trapped in the state of New Hampshire; cat hairs were found in only one of over 1,000 stomachs. An informal unfinished 2011 study in suburban upstate New York found no cat remains in 24 scat or stomach samples, and an earlier published study found no cat in 226 Massachusetts samples.

=== Poisoning ===
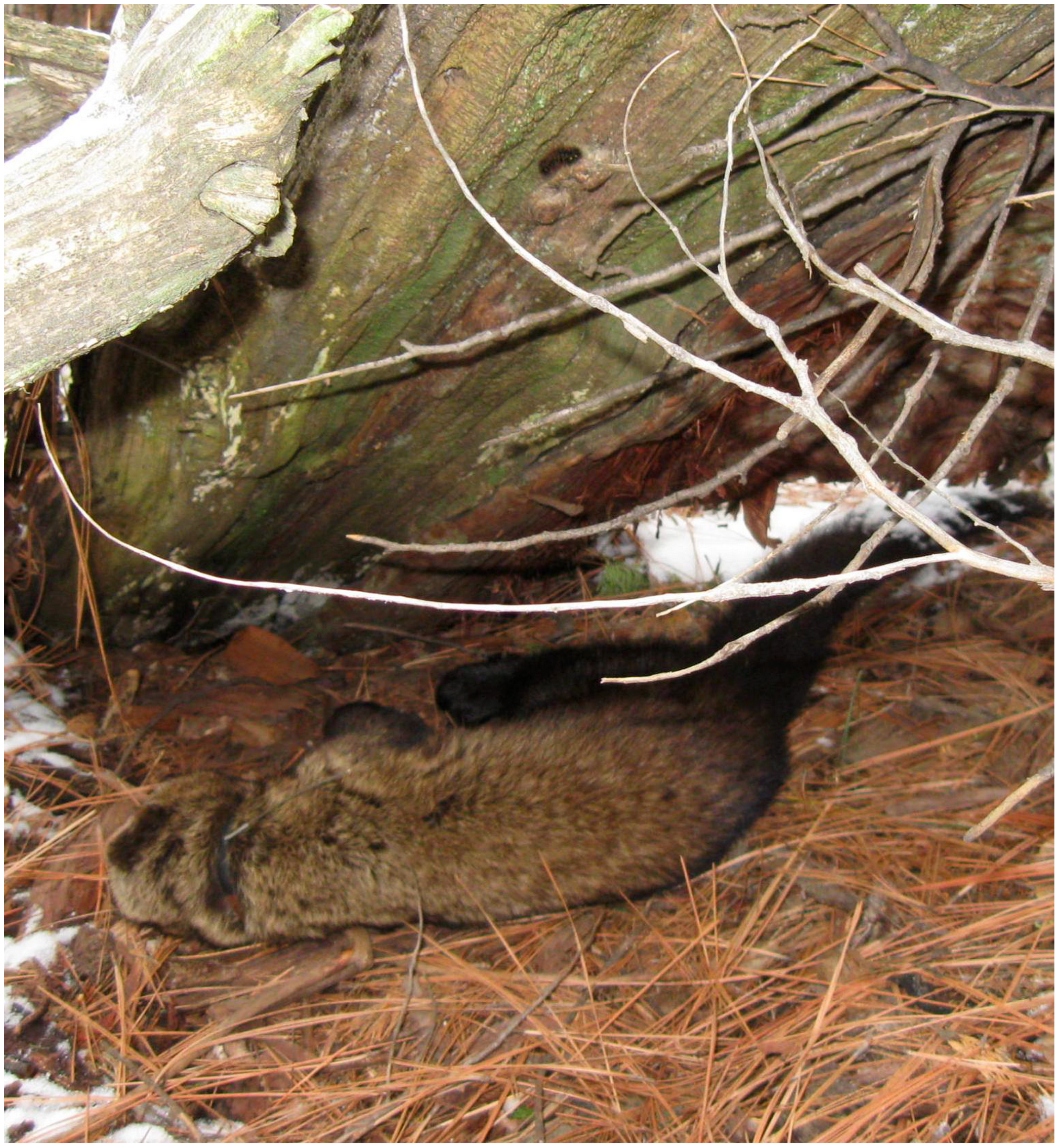
Male fisher killed by anticoagulant rodenticide on a marijuana grow site on US Forest Service lands, southern Sierra Nevada mountains

In 2012, a study conducted by the Integral Ecology Research Center, UC Davis, U.S. Forest Service, and the Hoopa tribe showed that fishers in California were exposed to and killed by anticoagulant rodenticides associated with marijuana cultivation. In this study, 79% of fishers that were tested in California were exposed to an average of 1.61 different anticoagulant rodenticides, and four fishers died from this exposure. A 2015 follow-up study building on these data determined that the trend of exposure and mortality from these toxicants increased to 85%, that California fishers were now exposed to an average of 1.73 different anticoagulant rodenticides, and that 9 more fishers died, bringing the total to 13. The extent of marijuana cultivation within fishers' home ranges was highlighted in a 2013 study focusing on fisher survival and impacts from marijuana cultivation within the Sierra National Forest. Fishers had an average of 5.3 individual grow sites within their home range. One fisher had 16 individual grow sites within its territory.

=== Literature ===
One of the first mentions of fishers in literature occurred in The Audubon Book of True Nature Stories. Robert Snyder relates a tale of his encounter with fishers in the woods of the Adirondack Mountains of New York. He recounts three sightings, including one where he witnessed a fisher attacking a porcupine.

In Winter of the Fisher, Cameron Langford relates a fictional encounter between a fisher and an aging recluse living in the forest. The recluse frees the fisher from a trap and nurses it back to health. The fisher tolerates the attention, but being a wild animal, returns to the forest when well enough. Langford uses the ecology and known habits of the fisher to weave a tale of survival and tolerance in the northern woods of Canada.

Fishers are mentioned in several other books, including The Blood Jaguar (an animal shaman), Ereth's Birthday (a porcupine hunter), Egg Marks The Spot (a treasure hunter), and in The Sign of the Beaver, where a fisher is thought to have been caught in a trap.
