= Pneumonia (non-human) =

Animal disease

Pneumonia is an irritation of the lungs caused by different sources. It is characterized by an inflammation of the deep lung tissues and the bronchi. Pneumonia can be acute or chronic. This life-threatening illness is more common in cats than in dogs and the complication “Kennel Cough” can occur in young pets.

== Routes of infection ==
Many causes can trigger an infection of the deep lung tissues. Specifically in younger pets an weak immune system can encourage pneumonia.

Concretely, the overreaction of various causes irritate the lungs.

=== Fungal ===
The most represented fungal infections are Coccidioides and Cryptococcus. Cryptococcus are most common in cats.

=== Bacterial ===
Pneumonia is most often caused by a bacterial infection. The bacterial infection occurs mainly after a viral infection. Some examples are canine distemper virus, adenovirus type 1 and 2, parainfluenza virus and feline calicivirus. Those viral infections cause lesions in the airways that allow bacteria to enter the respiratory system more easily.

The pneumonia caused by Tuberculous appears more often in dogs.

Gastric acid can also trigger pneumonia when a pet is throwing up, because the bacteria can more easily get in the lungs.

=== Viral ===
The disease progression begins with a viral infection which spreads into the respiratory tract and later develops into pneumonia. The symptoms of viral infections like canine distemper virus, adenovirus type 1 and 2, parainfluenza virus and feline calicivirus benefit a bacterial infection which ends in pneumonia.

=== Parasitic ===
Parasites, for example lung worms like Filaroides, Aelurostrongylus or Paragonimus get in the bronchi and cause pneumonia.

=== Allergic ===
Through an allergic reaction, the lung is infiltrated by inflammatory cells which cause pneumonia without any infection.

=== Protozoan ===
The probability that a dog or cat gets pneumonia through protozoans like Toxoplasma gondii or Pneumocystis jirovecii is really low.

=== Aspiration ===
There are several factors which might cause vomiting, for example dysfunctional esophagus, wrong medication or wrong food. By vomiting, the gastric acid injures the upper respiratory system which becomes vulnerable to bacterial infection and causes pneumonia.

== Symptoms ==
Dogs and cats who develop pneumonia usually show symptoms like moist or productive cough, followed by nasal discharge and breathing sounds. After some time, the respiratory rate becomes more rapid and breathing difficulties appear. Another conspicuous indication is appetite loss, followed by weight loss. Fever and lethargy are also common symptoms.

Also an obvious sign of a regular virus infection is that the pet does not respond to the threat of a regular viral infection.

== Diagnosis ==
When a pet is examined with suspicion of pneumonia, the veterinarian will first listen to the lungs and watch for any abnormal sounds.

If the pet shows typical lung noises for pneumonia, a complete blood count will be done which helps to determine the origin of the pneumonia. If the number of white blood cells is increased and the oxygen is low, pneumonia can be confirmed. The exact indicators of pneumonia can also be determined with the help of the blood count. If the neutrophils are increased, there is a bacterial infection, but if the eosinophils are increased the infection is parasitic. Increased neutrophils and monocytes indicate a fungal infection.

Chest x-rays are another diagnostic tool to determine the origin of pneumonia.

== Treatment ==
In order to exclude a mistreatment, it is urgently necessary to determine the exact cause of pneumonia.

To determine the location and type of treatment, the diseased animal is classified into one of the three conditions called stable, unstable and critical.

If the pet eats and drinks normally and only coughs slightly, it is in a stable condition and can be treated at home without hesitation. For home treatment, the pet is given antibiotics as pills. It is important not to expose the pet to wet and cold weather conditions. Inhalation and the application of the coupage technique favour the quick and complete healing of the pet. It is necessary to have regular check-ups with the veterinarian in order to adjust the treatment and prevent complications.

If the pet is neither active or has an appetite the pet is classified in an unstable state and must be treated in a clinic. If the pet is treated in a clinic, it will be given antibiotics intravenously to maximise the absorption of the drug. Tracheal cleansing can aid recovery and, in combination with inhalation, shorten the duration of recovery. Once the pet has reached a stable condition and regained its appetite, treatment is continued at home.

If the pet has significant respiratory problems it is classified as critical. In this condition, an oxygen therapy is urgently required. Permanent monitoring in a clinic is also necessary and x-rays and blood counts must be taken at regular intervals to check the condition.

The initial goal is to stabilise the patient and then continue with treatment at home.

== Prognosis ==
With the right treatment and adherence to the necessary measures, the pet will be completely healthy again after several weeks.

In extremely rare cases, however, very severe courses of the disease can lead to consequential damage to the respiratory system and even death.

== Prevention ==
To prevent pneumonia from developing, it is important to treat minor infections properly. Regular routine examinations and small check-ups are also important.
