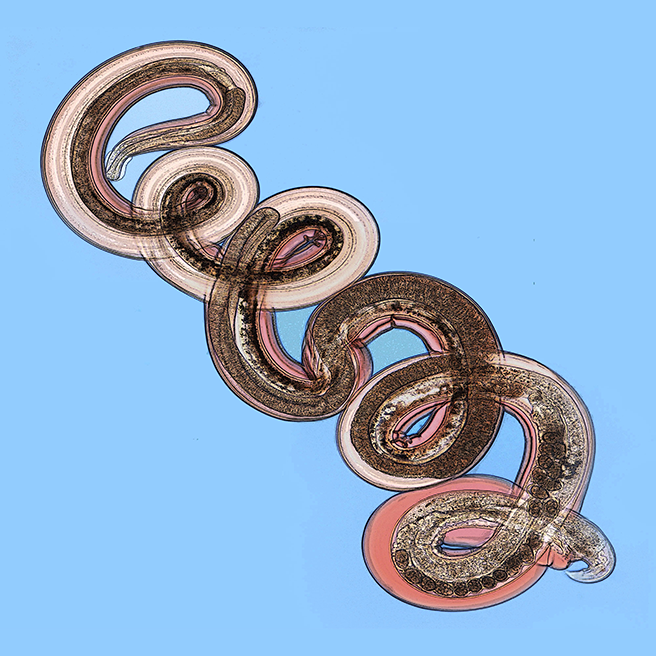
- Nippostrongylus brasiliensis

Scientific classification
- Domain: Eukaryota
- Kingdom: Animalia
- Phylum: Nematoda
- Class: Chromadorea
- Order: Rhabditida
- Suborder: Strongylida

Superfamilies
- Ancylostomatoidea; Diaphanocephaloidea; Heligosomoidea; Metastrongyloidea; Molineoidea; Strongyloidea; Trichostrongyloidea

= Strongylida =

Suborder of roundworms

The Strongylida suborder includes many of the important nematodes found in the gastrointestinal tracts of ruminants, horses, and swine, as well as the lungworms of ruminants and the hookworms of dogs and cats.

== Taxonomy ==
This suborder includes (superfamily - included families):

- Ancylostomatoidea
  - Ancylostomatidae
- Diaphanocephaloidea
  - Diaphanocephalidae
- Heligmosomoidea
  - Heligmosomidae
- Metastrongyloidea
  - Angiostrongylidae
  - Crenosomatidae
  - Filaroididae
  - Metastrongylidae
  - Protostrongylidae
  - Pseudaliidae
  - Syngamidae
- Molineoidea
  - Molineidae
- Strongyloidea
  - Chabertiidae
  - Cloacinidae
  - Deletrocephalidae
  - Stephanuridae
  - Strongylidae
- Trichostrongyloidea
  - Amidostomatidae
  - Cooperiidae
  - Dictyocaulidae
  - Dromaeostrongylidae
  - Haemonchidae
  - Heligmonellidae
  - Heligmosomatidae
  - Herpetostrongylidae
  - Mackerrasrtongylidae
  - Nicollinidae
  - Trichostrongylidae

== Major superfamilies ==
=== Diaphanocephaloidea ===
These are parasites of the digestive tracts of terrestrial snakes and, rarely, lizards. About 33 species are known in one family (Diaphanocephalidae), two genera (Diaphanocephalus and Kalicephalus) and six subgenera. Snakes can be orally infected with third-stage larvae experimentally, but it is a mystery how snakes become infected in the wild. Since snakes flick their tongue around to examine their environment, it is possible that the nematodes attach to the tongue. Kalicephalus species lack host specificity, and are intolerant of each other - different species space themselves apart in the host's gut.

=== Ancylostomatoidea ===
The hookworms, these have very large buccal cavities. They infect the small intestine of mammals. Many hookworms can infect the host by skin penetration, an important discovery made by A. Looss when he accidentally spilt larvae in water on his hand in 1898. The larvae release enzymes to assist their passage through the skin. There are three species that infect humans. Fourth-stage and adult hookworms suck blood, which can cause anaemia in humans with malnutrition. The third-stage larvae are carried by general circulation to the heart and lungs. In the lungs, they enter alveoli and begin to develop to the fourth stage. Then they migrate to the trachea and intestine. They attach to the wall of the intestine, reaching the adult stage in two to seven weeks, depending on the species. If the infective third stage is ingested orally, the worm can still, nevertheless, attach to the gut wall and develop to the adult stage. In a resistant host, the third stage larva can invade tissue and persist, eventually infecting offspring in females either in milk or prenatally. This phenomenon, well-studied in trichostrongyles of herbivores and known as arrest, occurs in several hookworm species such as Ancylostoma caninum in canids, Uncinaria lucasi in fur seals and Ancylostoma duodenale in humans.

=== Strongyloidea ===
These have large buccal capsules and leaf-like structures known as corona radiata. Most of them infect the large intestine by oral ingestion of the larva. The superfamily consists of the Strongylidae (including the strongyles of equines), Chabertiidae (including the nodular worms), Syngamidae (including the gapeworms of birds) and Deletrocephalidae (of Rhea americana). The gapeworms (Syngaminae) develop to the third larval stage inside the egg. Some strongyles, including the gapeworms, use earthworms and gastropods as paratenic hosts. The final hosts of strongyles are generally herbivores, such as horses, ruminants, ratite birds and Australian marsupials.

=== Trichostrongyloidea ===
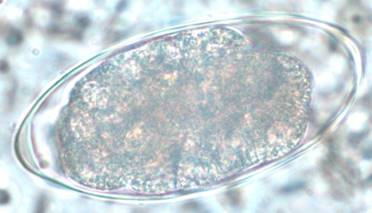
Egg of Trichostrongylus sp.

Trichostrongyloidea are divided into 14 families and 24 subfamilies. These worms have very small mouths and are found in a large number of hosts. They generally infect the stomach or intestine. Species that infect herbivorous hosts climb onto vegetation via films of moisture. Some species such as those infecting rodents can use either the oral or percutaneous route. There are unusual features in the development and transmission of some Trichostrongyloidea species. For example, Ollulanus tricuspis, which infects the stomach of pigs, is autoinfective: the sole means of transmission is through the pig vomiting. Arrested development is a well-studied feature, which may occur in temperate zones when the weather is too cold, or when it is too dry. This is known as seasonal arrest. In ewes, they wait for parturition and lactation, when there will be a population of young animals with little or no immunity; the sudden production of eggs by newly matured worms is known as spring rise. Another factor involved in stimulating arrest is overpopulation of adult worms.

=== Metastrongyloidea ===
All of these parasites go through a snail to infect the lungs or vascular system of mammals, like artiodactyls, carnivores, marsupials, and cetacea.
