= Oslerus =

Scientific classification
- Kingdom: Animalia
- Phylum: Nematoda
- Class: Chromadorea
- Order: Rhabditida
- Family: Filaroididae
- Genus: Oslerus; Hall, 1921

Genus of roundworms

Oslerus is a genus of nematodes belonging to the family Filaroididae.

The species of this genus are found Eastern Asia.

Species:

- Oslerus osleri
- Oslerus rostratus (Gerichter, 1945)
