= Otostrongylus =

Scientific classification
- Kingdom: Animalia
- Phylum: Nematoda
- Class: Chromadorea
- Order: Rhabditida
- Family: Crenosomatidae
- Genus: Otostrongylus de Bruyn, 1933
- Species: O. circumlitus

Binomial name
- Otostrongylus circumlitus (Railliet, 1899)

Genus of roundworms

Otostrongylus is a monotypic genus of nematodes belonging to the family Crenosomatidae. The only species is Otostrongylus circumlitus.

The species is found in Europe and Northern America.
