= Herpetostrongylidae =

Scientific classification
- Domain: Eukaryota
- Kingdom: Animalia
- Phylum: Nematoda
- Class: Chromadorea
- Order: Rhabditida
- Suborder: Strongylida
- Family: Herpetostrongylidae

Family of roundworms

Herpetostrongylidae is a family of nematodes belonging to the order Strongylida.

== Genera ==
Genera:

- Amphicephaloides Beveridge, 1979
- Austrostrongylus Chandler, 1924
- Beveridgiella Humphery-Smith, 1981
