= Crenosoma =

Scientific classification
- Kingdom: Animalia
- Phylum: Nematoda
- Class: Chromadorea
- Order: Rhabditida
- Family: Crenosomatidae
- Genus: Crenosoma; Molin, 1861

Genus of nematode worms

Crenosoma is a genus of nematodes belonging to the family Crenosomatidae.

The species of this genus are found in Europe and Northern America.

Species:

- Crenosoma brasiliense Vieira, Muniz-Pereira, Lima, Moraes Neto, Guimaraes & Luque, 2012
- Crenosoma caucasicum Rodonaja, 1951
