= Filaroididae =

Scientific classification
- Domain: Eukaryota
- Kingdom: Animalia
- Phylum: Nematoda
- Class: Chromadorea
- Order: Rhabditida
- Suborder: Strongylida
- Family: Filaroididae

Family of roundworms

Filaroididae is a family of nematodes belonging to the order Strongylida.

Genera:

- Filariopsis Van Thiel, 1926
- Filaroides van Beneden, 1858
- Oslerus Hall, 1921
- Parafilaroides Dougherty, 1946
- Rauschivingylus Kontrimav'ichus & Delyamure, 1979
