= Amidostomatidae =

Scientific classification
- Domain: Eukaryota
- Kingdom: Animalia
- Phylum: Nematoda
- Class: Chromadorea
- Order: Rhabditida
- Suborder: Strongylida
- Family: Amidostomatidae

Family of roundworms

Amidostomatidae is a family of nematodes belonging to the order Strongylida.

Genera:

- Amidostomum Railliet & Henry, 1909
- Epomidiostomum Skrjabin, 1915
