= Cloacinidae =

Scientific classification
- Domain: Eukaryota
- Kingdom: Animalia
- Phylum: Nematoda
- Class: Chromadorea
- Order: Rhabditida
- Suborder: Strongylida
- Family: Cloacinidae

Family of roundworms

Cloacinidae is a family of nematodes belonging to the order Strongylida.

Genera:

- Labiostrongylus Yorke & Maplestone, 1926
