= Parafilaroides =

Scientific classification
- Domain: Eukaryota
- Kingdom: Animalia
- Phylum: Nematoda
- Class: Chromadorea
- Order: Rhabditida
- Family: Filaroididae
- Genus: Parafilaroides; Dougherty, 1946

Genus of roundworms

Parafilaroides is a genus of nematodes belonging to the family Filaroididae.

The species of this genus are found in Northern America.

Species:

- Parafilaroides decorus Dougherty & Herman, 1947
- Parafilaroides gullandae Dailey, 2006
- Parafilaroides gymnurus (Railliet, 1899) Dougherty, 1946
- Parafilaroides hispidus (Kennedy, 1986)
- Parafilaroides hydrurgae Mawson, 1953
- Parafilaroides measuresae Dailey, 2006
- Parafilaroides nanus Dougherty & Herman, 1947
- Parafilaroides normani Dailey, 2009
- Parafilaroides prolificus Dougherty & Herman, 1947
