= Amidostomum =

Scientific classification
- Kingdom: Animalia
- Phylum: Nematoda
- Class: Chromadorea
- Order: Rhabditida
- Family: Amidostomatidae
- Genus: Amidostomum; Railliet & Henry, 1909

Synonyms
- Amidostomoides Lomakin, 1991

Genus of roundworms

Amidostomum is a genus of nematodes belonging to the family Amidostomatidae.

The genus has cosmopolitan distribution.

Species:

- Amidostomum acutum (Lundahl, 1848)
- Amidostomum anseris (Zeder, 1800)
- Amidostomum cygni Wehr, 1933
- Amidostomum fulicae (Rudolphi, 1819)
- Amidostomum henryi Skrjabin, 1915
- Amidostomum spatulatum Baylis, 1932
