= Mexican bobcat =

Scientific classification
- Kingdom: Animalia
- Phylum: Chordata
- Class: Mammalia
- Order: Carnivora
- Family: Felidae
- Genus: Lynx
- Species: L. rufus
- Subspecies: L. r. fasciatus
- Population: Mexican bobcat

Synonyms
- Lynx rufus escuinapae; Lynx rufus oaxacensis

Population of bobcats in Mexico

The Mexican bobcat is a population of the bobcat in Mexico part of the subspecies Lynx rufus fasciatus. The Mexican bobcat is most commonly found in the states of Sinaloa and Nayarit. As of 2017, it is uncertain whether or not this is a valid subspecies.

== Appearance ==
The Mexican bobcat is the smallest of the bobcat subspecies and grows to about twice the size of a house cat. It is similar in appearance to the lynx except for the tail, which is darker in color. Adults of this species range from nine to thirty pounds. The coat color of this animal varies from light gray to reddish brown. The coat is covered in more spots than that of the northern subspecies of bobcat and has shorter, denser hair than its northern cousin. This species has the distinctive black stripes of fur on the forelegs and a black tip on the tail along with black tipped ears and a whiskered face. A tuft of fur frames the animal's face.

== Habitat ==
The Mexican bobcat is found throughout Mexico, but primarily in Baja, western Mexico, and southward from the Sonoran desert. The creature is also found in the Mexican states of Sinaloa and Nayarit, as well as parts of Sonora, Jalisco, Durango, San Luis Potosí, Nuevo León, Hidalgo, Morelos, Puebla, Tlaxcala, Tamaulipas, Michoacán, Guerrero, Veracruz, and Oaxaca. The Mexican bobcat lives in a variety of areas, including forests, coastal swamps, deserts, and scrublands. The animals are nonmigratory and are territorial. The territory of a male Mexican bobcat may stretch for a few miles and overlap with several female bobcat and male bobcat territories. The female Mexican bobcat's territory rarely overlaps with another female's territory.

== Lifestyle ==
Mexican bobcats are carnivores and eat rodents, jackrabbits, collared peccaries, birds, deer, and white-nosed coatis. On occasion they will hunt snakes, lizards, and scorpions. They are solitary, nocturnal animals and are rarely seen by humans. The animals gather briefly once a year to mate. The Mexican bobcat breeding season can take place anytime during the year and is not strictly limited to spring. The female gives birth to a litter of two to three kittens, which she raises on her own. The species generally lives for ten to twelve years.

== Threats ==
Modern threats to the Mexican bobcat are habitat destruction, illegal trapping and shooting, and militarization of the U.S. - Mexico border. Although the bobcat was added to the U.S. Endangered Species List in June 1976, a delisting of the Mexican bobcat species was proposed in 2003. An official proposition to delist the species was made a few years later, although the species still remains on the list.
