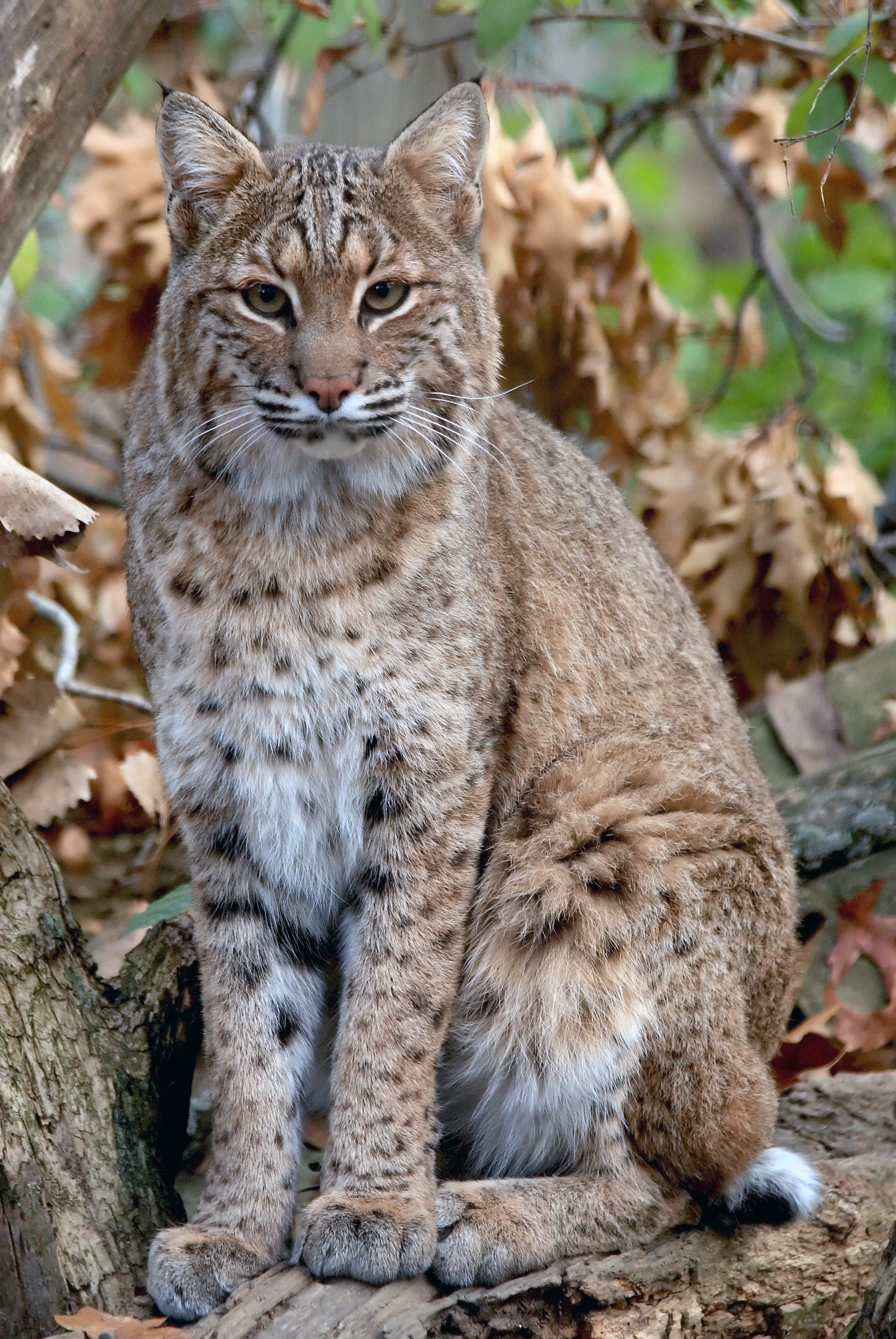
- Bobcat in Columbus Zoo

Conservation status
- Least Concern (IUCN 3.1)
- CITES Appendix II

Scientific classification
- Kingdom: Animalia
- Phylum: Chordata
- Class: Mammalia
- Order: Carnivora
- Family: Felidae
- Genus: Lynx
- Species: L. rufus

Binomial name
- Lynx rufus (Schreber, 1777)
- Range in 2016

Synonyms
- See text

= Bobcat =

Medium-sized North American wild cat

The bobcat (Lynx rufus), also known as the wildcat, bay lynx, or red lynx, is one of the four extant species within the medium-sized wild cat genus Lynx. Native to North America, it ranges from southern Canada through most of the contiguous United States to Oaxaca in Mexico. It is listed as Least Concern on the IUCN Red List since 2002, due to its wide distribution and large population. Although it has been hunted extensively both for sport and fur, populations have proven stable, though declining in some areas.

It has distinctive black bars on its forelegs and a black-tipped, stubby (or "bobbed") tail, from which it derives its name. It reaches a total length (including the tail) of up to 125 cm (50 in). It is an adaptable predator inhabiting wooded areas, semidesert, urban edge, forest edge, and swampland environments. It remains in some of its original range, but populations are vulnerable to extirpation by coyotes and domestic animals.

Though the bobcat prefers rabbits and hares, it hunts insects, chickens, geese and other birds, small rodents, and deer. Prey selection depends on location and habitat, season, and abundance. Like most cats, the bobcat is territorial and largely solitary, although with some overlap in home ranges. It uses several methods to mark its territorial boundaries, including claw marks and deposits of urine or feces. The bobcat breeds from winter into spring and has a gestation period of about two months.

Two subspecies are recognized: one east of the Great Plains, and the other west of the Great Plains. It is featured in some stories of the indigenous peoples of North and Central America, and in the folklore of European-descended inhabitants of the Americas.

== Taxonomy and evolution ==
Felis rufa was the scientific name proposed by Johann Christian Daniel von Schreber in 1777. In the 19th and 20th centuries, the following zoological specimens were described:

- Lynx floridanus proposed by Constantine Samuel Rafinesque in 1817 was a greyish lynx with yellowish brown spots from Florida.
- Lynx fasciatus also proposed by Rafinesque in 1817 was a reddish-brown lynx with thick fur from the northwest coast.
- Lynx baileyi proposed by Clinton Hart Merriam in 1890 was a female lynx that was shot in the San Francisco Mountains.
- Lynx texensis proposed by Joel Asaph Allen in 1895 to replace the earlier name Lynx rufus var. maculatus.
- Lynx gigas proposed by Outram Bangs in 1897 was a skin of an adult male lynx shot near Bear River, Nova Scotia.
- Lynx rufus eremicus and Lynx rufus californicus proposed by Edgar Alexander Mearns in 1898 were skins and skulls of two adult lynxes killed in San Diego County, California.
- Lynx rufus peninsularis proposed by Oldfield Thomas in 1898 was a skull and a pale rufous skin of a male lynx from Baja California Peninsula.
- Lynx fasciatus pallescens proposed by Merriam in 1899 was a skin of a gray lynx that was killed near Trout Lake, Washington.
- Lynx ruffus escuinapae proposed by Allen in 1903 was a skull and a pale rufous skin of an adult female from Escuinapa Municipality in Mexico.
- Lynx rufus superiorensis by Randolph Lee Peterson and Stuart C. Downing in 1952 was a skeleton and skin of a male lynx killed near Port Arthur, Ontario.
- Lynx rufus oaxacensis proposed by George Goodwin in 1963 was based on three skulls and six skins of lynxes killed in the Mexican Tehuantepec District.

The validity of these subspecies was challenged in 1981 because of the minor differences between specimens from the various geographic regions in North America.

Since the revision of cat taxonomy in 2017, only two subspecies are recognized as valid taxa:

Image	Subspecies	Distribution
	L. r. rufus (Schreber, 1777)	east of the Great Plains
	L. r. fasciatus Rafinesque, 1817	west of the Great Plains

=== Phylogeny ===
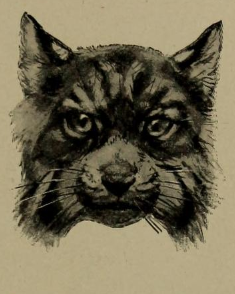
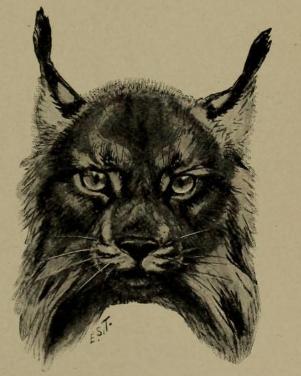
The Canada lynx (right) has distinct tufts atop its ears and longer "mutton chop" style fur on its lower face

The genus Lynx shares a clade with the genera Puma, Prionailurus and Felis dated to 7.15 million years ago; Lynx diverged approximately 3.24 million years ago.

The bobcat is thought to have evolved from the Eurasian lynx (L. lynx), which crossed into North America by way of the Bering Land Bridge during the Pleistocene, with progenitors arriving as early as 2.6 million years ago. It first appeared during the Irvingtonian stage around 1.8 million years ago. The first bobcat wave moved into the southern portion of North America, which was soon cut off from the north by glaciers; the population evolved into the modern bobcat around 20,000 years ago. A second population arrived from Asia and settled in the north, developing into the modern Canada lynx (L. canadensis). Hybridization between the bobcat and the Canada lynx may sometimes occur. The populations east and west of the Great Plains were probably separated during Pleistocene interglacial periods due to the aridification of the region.

== Description ==
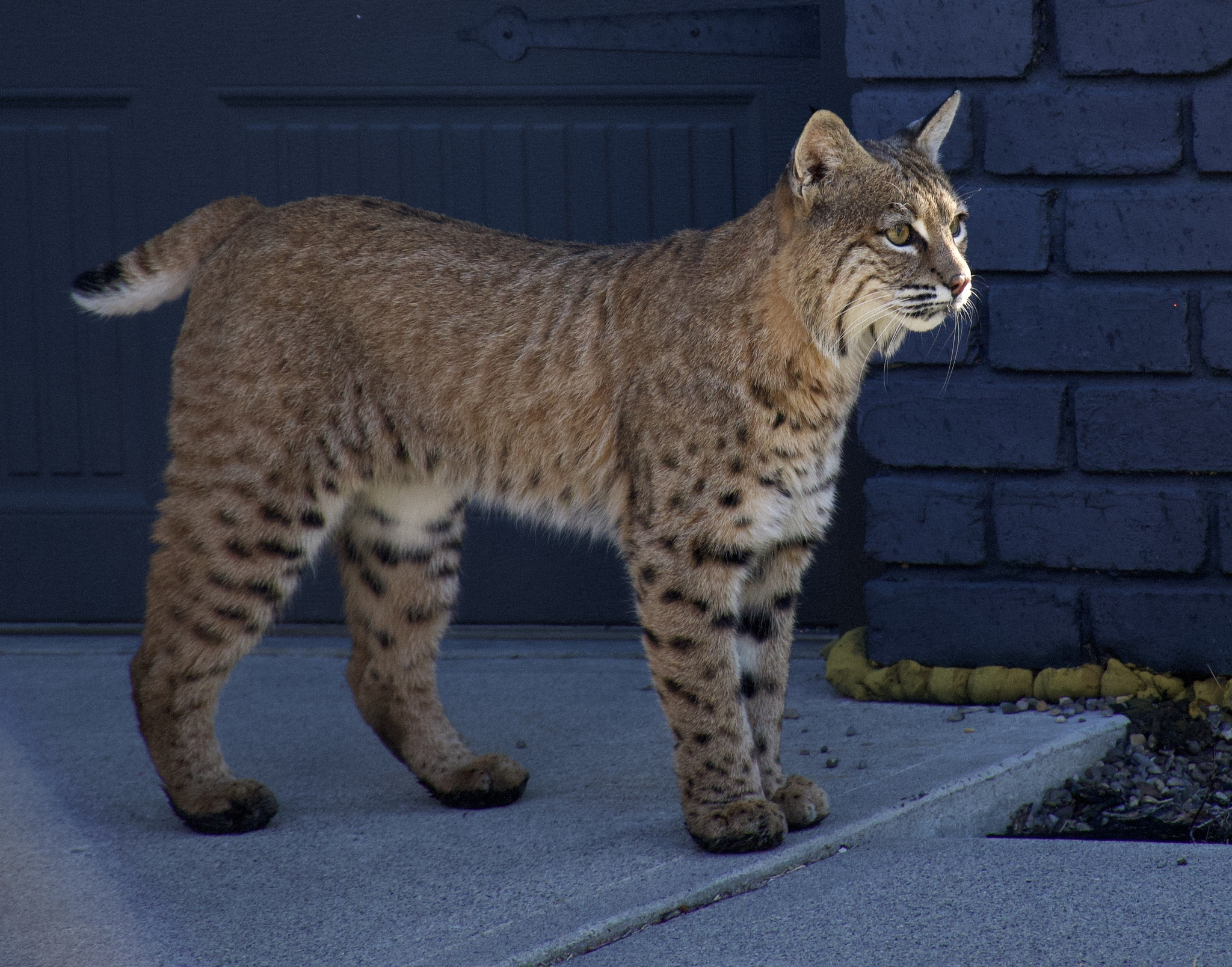
In Alberta

The bobcat resembles other species of the midsize genus Lynx, but is on average the smallest of the four. Its coat is variable, though generally tan to grayish-brown, with black streaks on the body and dark bars on the forelegs and tail. Its spotted patterning acts as camouflage. The ears are black-tipped and pointed, with short, black tufts. Generally, an off-white color is seen on the lips, chin, and underparts. Bobcats in the desert regions of the southwest have the lightest-colored coats, while those in the northern, forested regions are darkest. Kittens are born well-furred and already have their spots. A few melanistic bobcats have been sighted and captured in Florida, USA, and New Brunswick, Canada. They appear black, but may still exhibit a spot pattern.

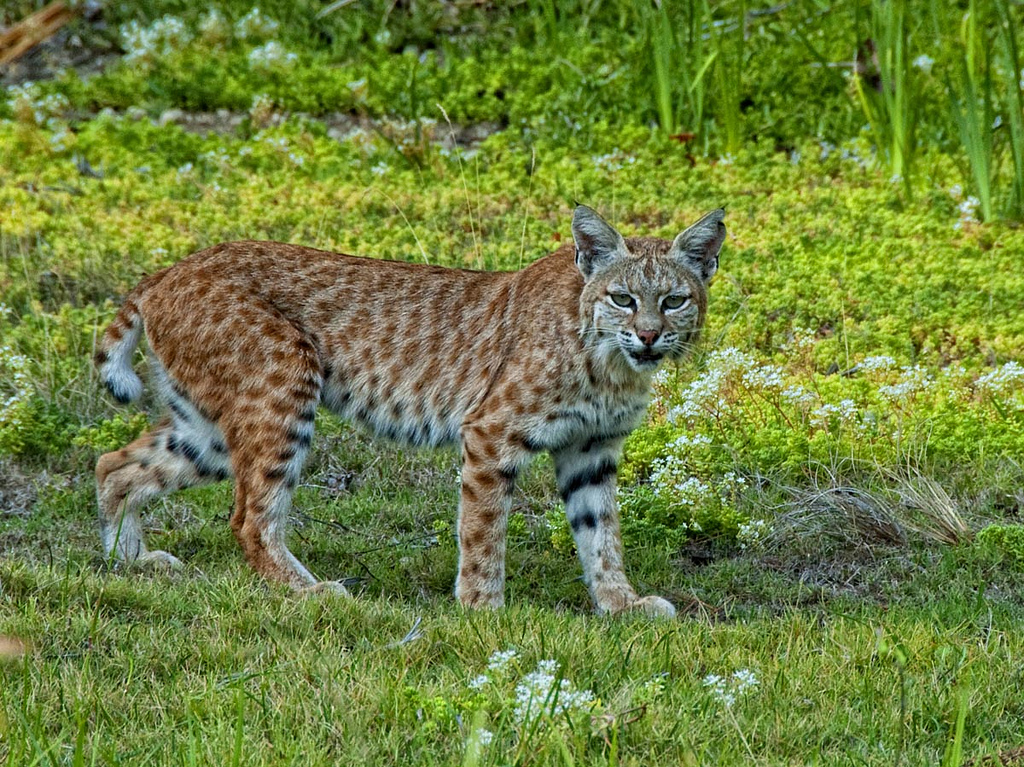
The small tufts on a bobcat's ears are difficult to spot at even moderate distance

The face appears wide due to ruffs of extended hair beneath the ears. Bobcat eyes are yellow with black slit pupils. The nose of the bobcat is pinkish-red, and it has a base color of gray or yellowish- or brownish-red on its face, sides, and back. The pupils widen during nocturnal activity to maximize light reception. The bobcat has sharp hearing and vision, and a good sense of smell. It is an excellent climber and swims when it needs to, but normally avoids water.

The adult bobcat is 47.5–125 cm (18.7–49.2 in) long from the head to the base of its distinctive stubby tail, averaging 82.7 cm (32.6 in); the tail is 9 to 20 cm (3.5 to 7.9 in) long. Its "bobbed" appearance gives the species its name. An adult stands about 30 to 60 cm (12 to 24 in) at the shoulders.

Adult males can range in weight from 6.4–18.3 kg (14–40 lb), with an average of 9.6 kg (21 lb); females at 4–15.3 kg (8.8–33.7 lb), with an average of 6.8 kg (15 lb). The largest bobcat accurately measured on record weighed 22.2 kg (49 lb), although unverified reports have them reaching 27 kg (60 lb). Furthermore, a June 20, 2012, report of a New Hampshire roadkill specimen listed the animal's weight at 27 kg (60 lb). The largest-bodied bobcats were recorded in eastern Canada and northern New England, and the smallest in the southern Appalachian Mountains. Consistent with Bergmann's rule, the bobcat is larger in its northern range and in open habitats. A morphological size comparison study in the eastern United States found a divergence in the location of the largest male and female specimens, suggesting differing selection constraints for the sexes. Skeletal muscles make up 58.5 % of the bobcat's body weight. At birth, it weighs 270–340 g (9 1/2–12 oz) and is about 25 cm (10 in) in length. At the age of one year, it weighs about 4.5 kg (10 lb).

=== Tracks ===
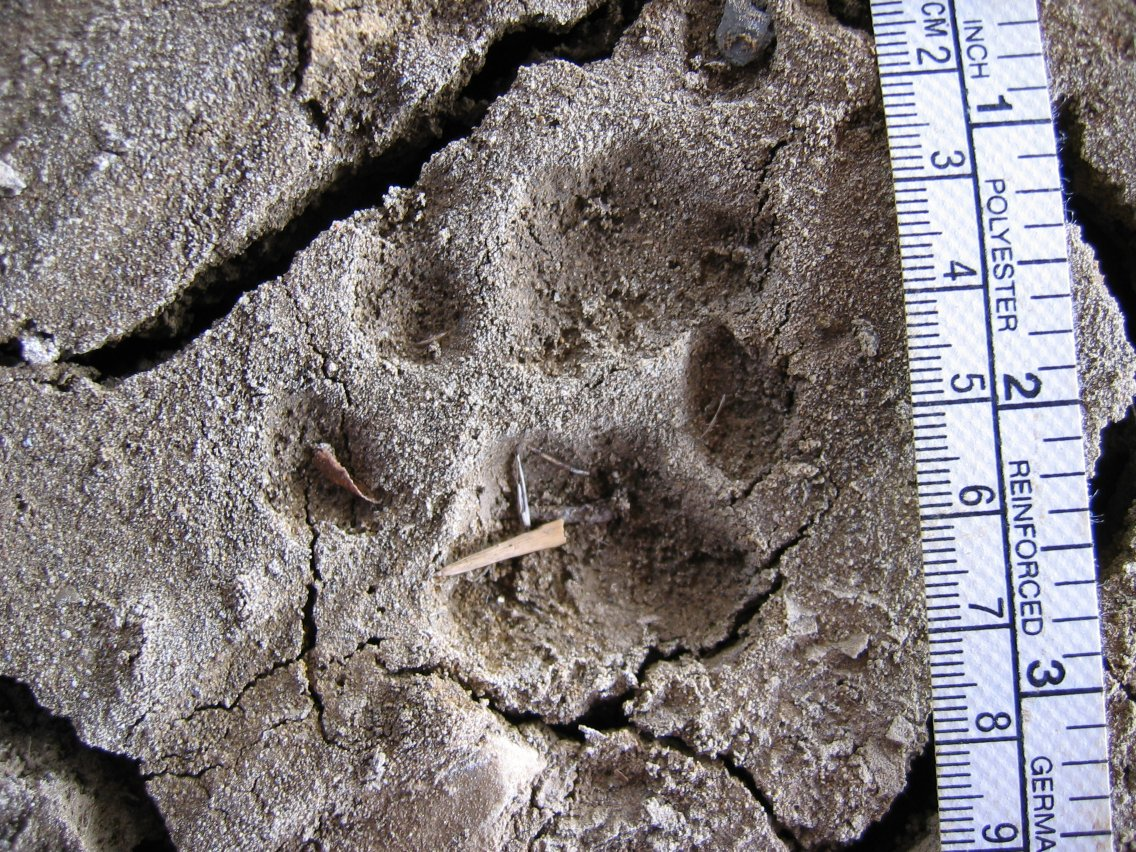
Bobcat tracks in mud showing the hindpaw print (top) partially covering the forepaw print (center)

Bobcat tracks show four toes without claw marks, due to their retractile claws. The tracks range in size from 25–75 mm (1–3 in); the average is about 45 mm (1 3/4 in). When walking or trotting, the tracks are spaced roughly 20 to 45 cm (8 to 18 in) apart. The bobcat can make great strides when running, often from 1.2–2.4 m (4–8 ft).

Like all cats, the bobcat 'directly registers', meaning its hind prints usually fall exactly on top of its fore prints. Bobcat tracks can be generally distinguished from feral or house cat tracks by their larger size: about 15 cm^{2} (2 sq in) versus 10 cm^{2} (1 1/2 sq in).

== Distribution and habitat ==
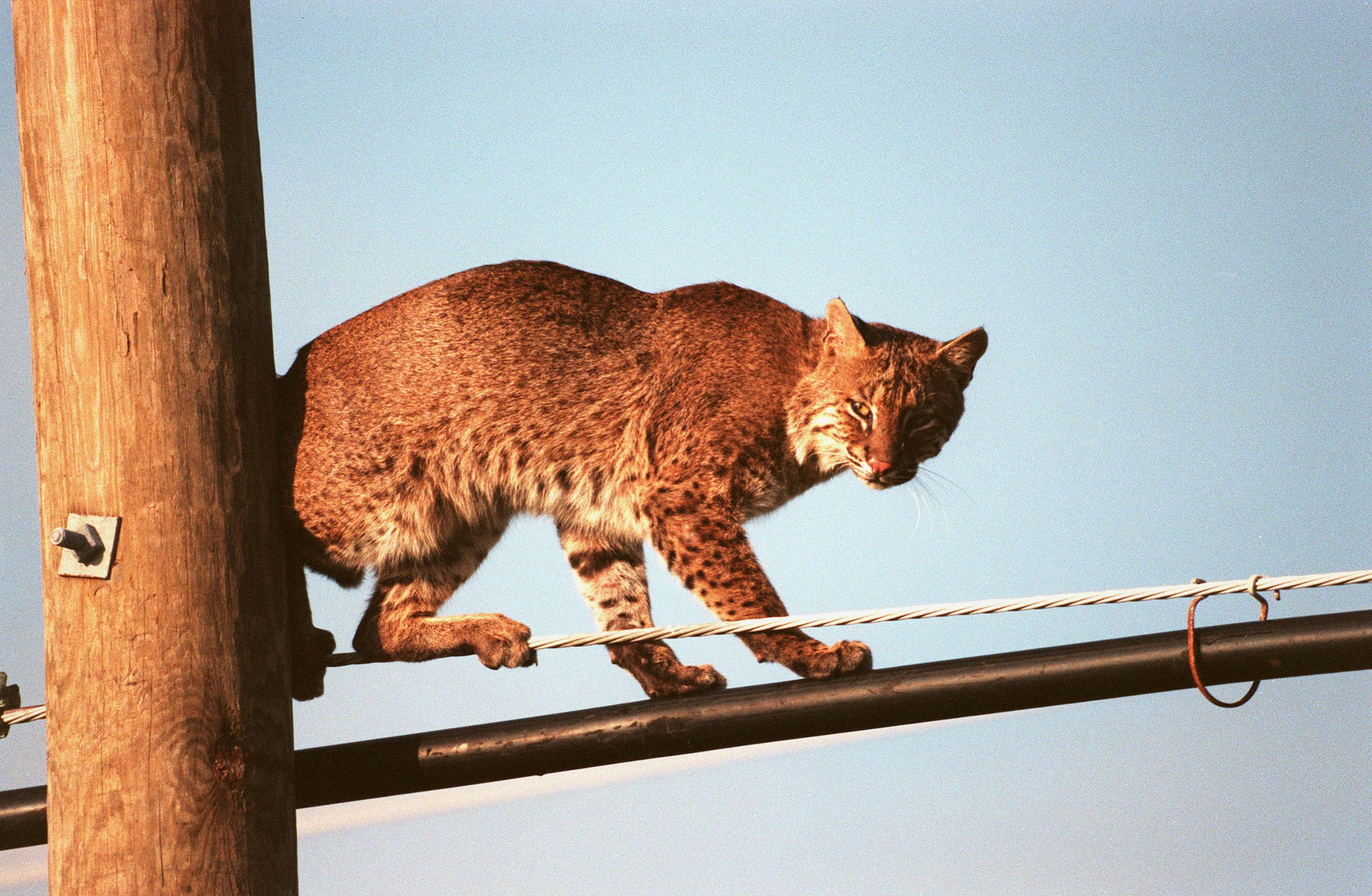
A bobcat climbing on a utility pole at the Kennedy Space Center in Florida. The species' range does not seem to be limited by human populations, as long as it can still find a suitable habitat.

The bobcat is an adaptable species. It prefers woodlands—deciduous, coniferous, or mixed—but does not depend exclusively on the deep forest. It ranges from the humid swamps of Florida to desert lands of Texas or rugged mountain areas. It makes its home near agricultural areas, if rocky ledges, swamps, or forested tracts are present; its spotted coat serves as camouflage. The population of the bobcat depends primarily on the population of its prey; other principal factors in the selection of habitat type include protection from severe weather, availability of resting and den sites, dense cover for hunting and escape, and freedom from disturbance.

The bobcat's range does not seem to be limited by human populations, but by the availability of suitable habitat; only large, intensively cultivated tracts are unsuitable for the species. The animal may appear in backyards in "urban edge" environments, where human development intersects with natural habitats. When chased by a dog, bobcats usually climb a tree.

The historical range of the bobcat was from southern Canada, throughout the United States, and as far south as the Mexican state of Oaxaca, and it persists across much of this area. In the 20th century, it was thought to have lost territory in the US Midwest and parts of the Northeast, including southern Minnesota, eastern South Dakota, and much of Missouri, mostly due to habitat changes from modern agricultural practices. While thought to no longer exist in western New York and Pennsylvania, multiple confirmed sightings of bobcats (including dead specimens) have been recently reported in New York's Southern Tier and in central New York, and a bobcat was captured in 2018 on a tourist boat in Downtown Pittsburgh, Pennsylvania. In addition, bobcat sightings have been confirmed in northern Indiana, and one was killed near Albion, Michigan, in 2008. In early March 2010, a bobcat was sighted (and later captured by animal control authorities) in a parking garage in Downtown Houston. By 2010, bobcats appear to have recolonized many states, occurring in every state in the contiguous 48 except Delaware.

The bobcat population in Canada is limited due to both snow depth and the presence of the Canada lynx. The bobcat does not tolerate deep snow and waits out heavy storms in sheltered areas; it lacks the large, padded feet of the Canada lynx and cannot support its weight on snow as efficiently. The bobcat is not entirely at a disadvantage where its range meets that of the larger felid: displacement of the Canada lynx by the aggressive bobcat has been observed where they interact in Nova Scotia. At the same time, the clearing of coniferous forests for agriculture has led to a northward retreat of the Canada lynx's range to the advantage of the bobcat. In northern and central Mexico, the cat is found in dry scrubland and forests of pine and oak; its range ends at the tropical southern portion of the country.

== Behavior and ecology ==
Video of a bobcat in a buckeye tree

The bobcat is crepuscular and is active mostly during twilight. It keeps on the move from three hours before sunset until about midnight, and then again from before dawn until three hours after sunrise. Each night, it moves from 3 to 11 km (2 to 7 mi) along its habitual route. This behavior may vary seasonally, as bobcats become more diurnal during fall and winter in response to the activity of their prey, which are more active during the day in colder weather.

=== Social structure and home range ===
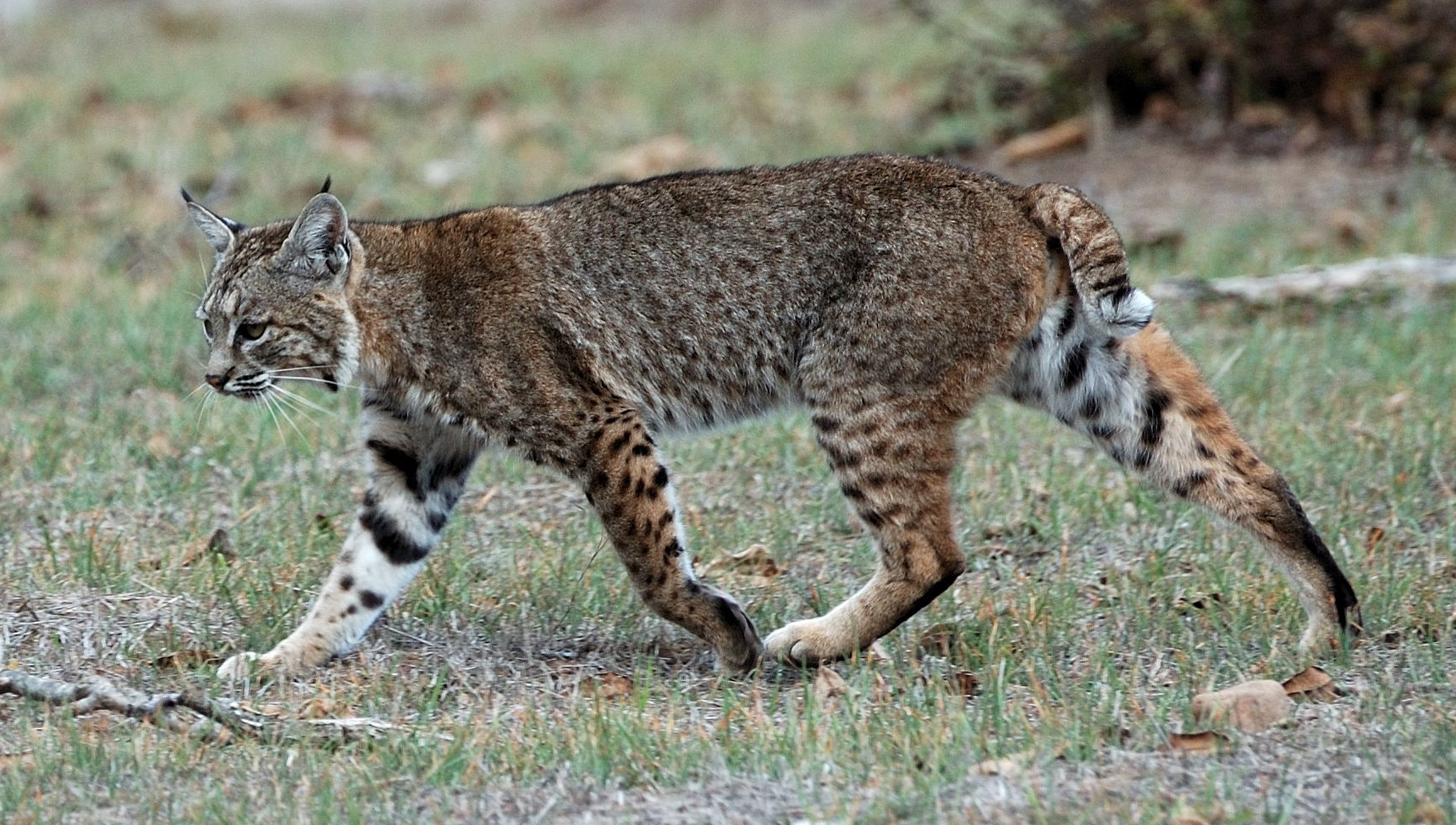
Bobcat spotted in South San Jose, California

Bobcat activities are confined to well-defined territories, which vary in size depending on the sex and the distribution of prey. The home range is marked with feces, urine scent, and by clawing prominent trees in the area. In its territory, the bobcat has numerous places of shelter, usually a main den, and several auxiliary shelters on the outer extent of its range, such as hollow logs, brush piles, thickets, or under rock ledges. Its den smells strongly of the bobcat. The sizes of bobcats' home ranges vary significantly from 0.596–326 km^{2} (0.23–126 sq mi).

One study in Kansas found resident males to have ranges of roughly 21 km^{2} (8 sq mi), and females less than half that area. Transient bobcats were found to have home ranges of 57 km^{2} (22 sq mi) and less well-defined home ranges. Kittens had the smallest range at about 8 km^{2} (3 sq mi). Dispersal from the natal range is most pronounced with males.

Reports on seasonal variation in range size have been equivocal. One study found a large variation in male range sizes, from 41 km^{2} (16 sq mi) in summer up to 104 km^{2} (40 sq mi) in winter. Another found that female bobcats, especially those which were reproductively active, expanded their home range in winter, but that males merely shifted their range without expanding it, which was consistent with numerous earlier studies. Other research in various American states has shown little or no seasonal variation.

Like most felines, the bobcat is largely solitary, but ranges often overlap. Unusual for cats, males are more tolerant of overlap, while females rarely wander into others' ranges. Given their smaller range sizes, two or more females may reside within a male's home range. When multiple territories overlap, a dominance hierarchy is often established, resulting in the exclusion of some transients from favored areas.

In line with widely differing estimates of home range size, population density figures diverge from one to 38 bobcats per 26 km^{2} (10 sq mi) in one survey. The average is estimated at one bobcat per 13 km^{2} (5 sq mi). A link has been observed between population density and sex ratio. An unhunted population in California had a sex ratio of 2.1 males per female. When the density decreased, the sex ratio skewed to 0.86 males per female. Another study observed a similar ratio and suggested the males may be better able to cope with the increased competition, and this helped limit reproduction until various factors lowered the density.

=== Hunting and diet ===
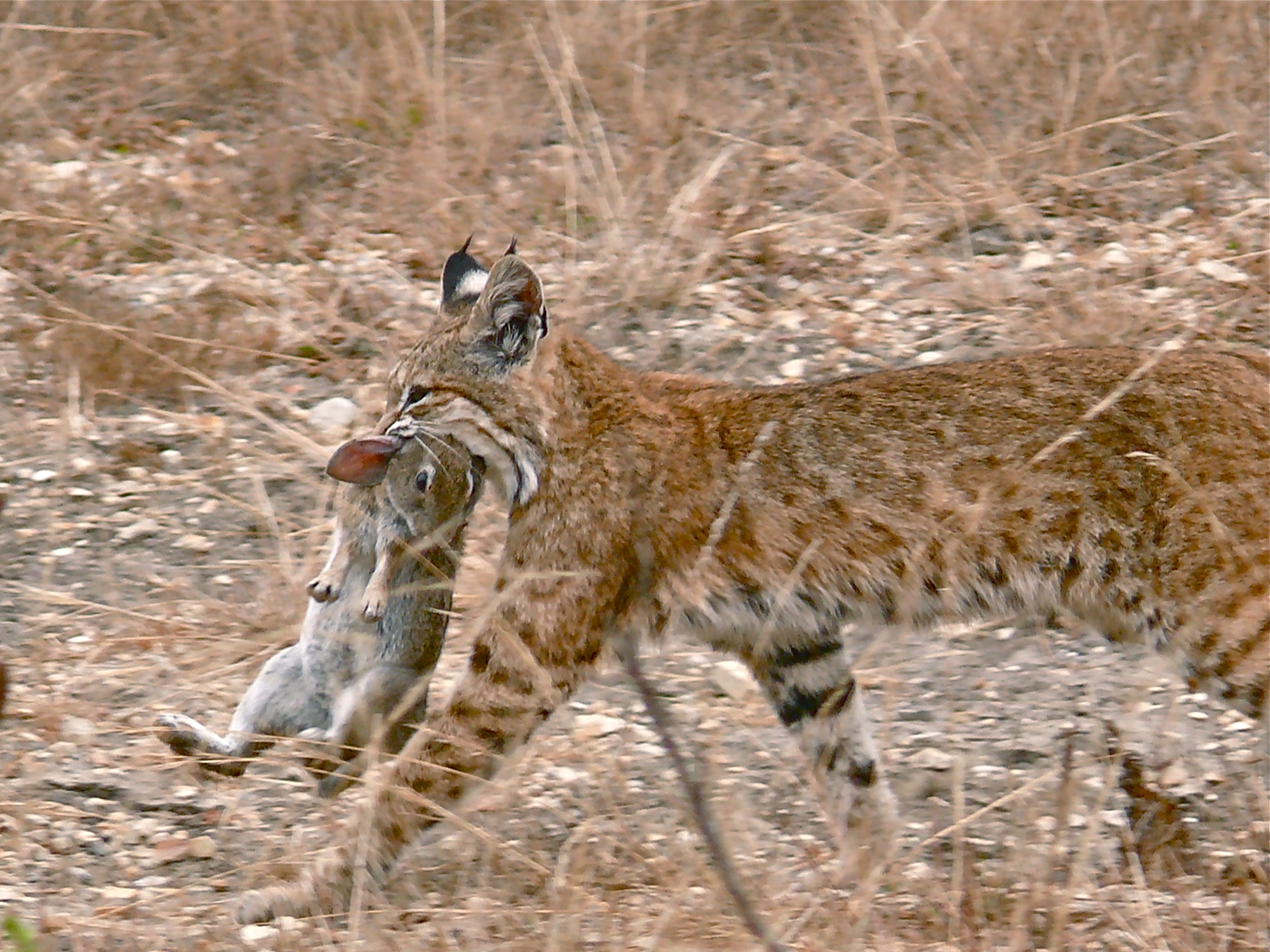
With a rabbit

The bobcat is able to survive for long periods without food, but eats heavily when prey is abundant. During lean periods, it often preys on larger animals, which it can kill and return to feed on later. The bobcat hunts by stalking its prey and then ambushing with a short chase or pounce. Its preference is for mammals weighing about 0.7–6 kg (1 1/2–12 1/2 lb). Its main prey varies by region: in the eastern United States, it is the eastern cottontail and New England cottontail, and in the north, it is the snowshoe hare.

When these prey species exist together, as in New England, they are the primary food sources of the bobcat. In the far south, the rabbits and hares are sometimes replaced by cotton rats as the primary food source. Birds up to the size of an adult trumpeter swan are also taken in ambushes while nesting, along with their fledglings and eggs. The bobcat is an opportunistic predator that, unlike the more specialized Canada lynx, readily varies its prey selection. Diet diversification positively correlates with a decline in the numbers of the bobcat's principal prey; the abundance of its main prey species is the main determinant of overall diet.

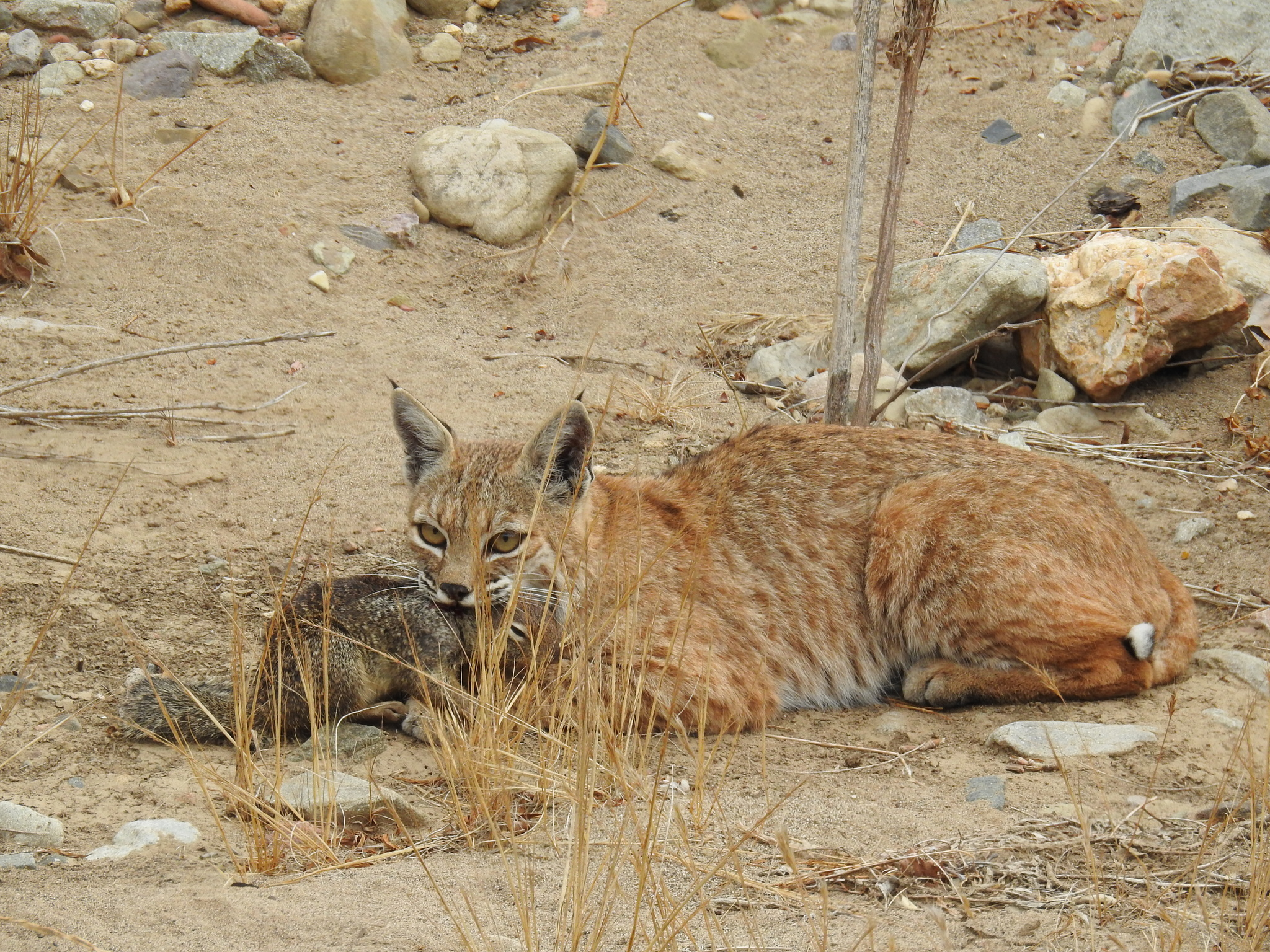
With a California ground squirrel

The bobcat hunts animals of different sizes and adjusts its hunting techniques accordingly. It hunts in areas abundant in prey and waits lying or crouching for prey to wander close. It then pounces and grabs the prey with its sharp, retractable claws. For slightly larger animals, such as geese, ducks, rabbits, and hares, it stalks from cover and waits until prey comes within 6 to 11 m (20 to 35 ft) before rushing in to attack. Less commonly, it feeds on larger animals, such as young ungulates, and other carnivores, such as primarily female fishers, gray foxes, American minks, American martens, skunks, raccoons, small dogs and domestic cats. It also hunts rodents such as squirrels, moles, muskrats, mice, but also birds, small sharks, and insects. Bobcats occasionally hunt livestock and poultry. While larger species, such as cattle and horses, are not known to be attacked, bobcats do present a threat to smaller ruminants such as pigs, sheep and goats. According to the National Agricultural Statistics Service, bobcats killed 11,100 sheep in 2004, comprising 4.9% of all sheep predator deaths. However, some amount of bobcat predation may be misidentified, as bobcats have been known to scavenge on the remains of livestock kills by other animals.

The bobcat has been known to kill deer or pronghorn, and sometimes to hunt elk in western North America, especially in winter when smaller prey is scarce, or when deer populations become more abundant. One study in the Everglades showed a large majority of kills (33 of 39) were fawns. In Yellowstone, a large number of kills (15 of 20) were elk calves, but prey up to eight times the bobcat's weight could be successfully taken. It stalks the deer, often when the deer is lying down, then rushes in and grabs it by the neck before biting the throat, base of the skull, or chest. On the rare occasions a bobcat kills a deer, it eats its fill and then buries the carcass under snow or leaves, often returning to it several times to feed.

The bobcat prey base overlaps with that of other midsized predators of a similar ecological niche. Research in Maine has shown little evidence of competitive relationships between the bobcat and coyote or red fox; separation distances and territory overlap appeared random among simultaneously monitored animals. However, other studies have found bobcat populations may decrease in areas with high coyote populations, with the more social inclination of the canid giving them a possible competitive advantage. With the Canada lynx, however, the interspecific relationship affects distribution patterns; competitive exclusion by the bobcat is likely to have prevented any further southward expansion of the range of its felid relative.

=== Reproduction and life cycle ===
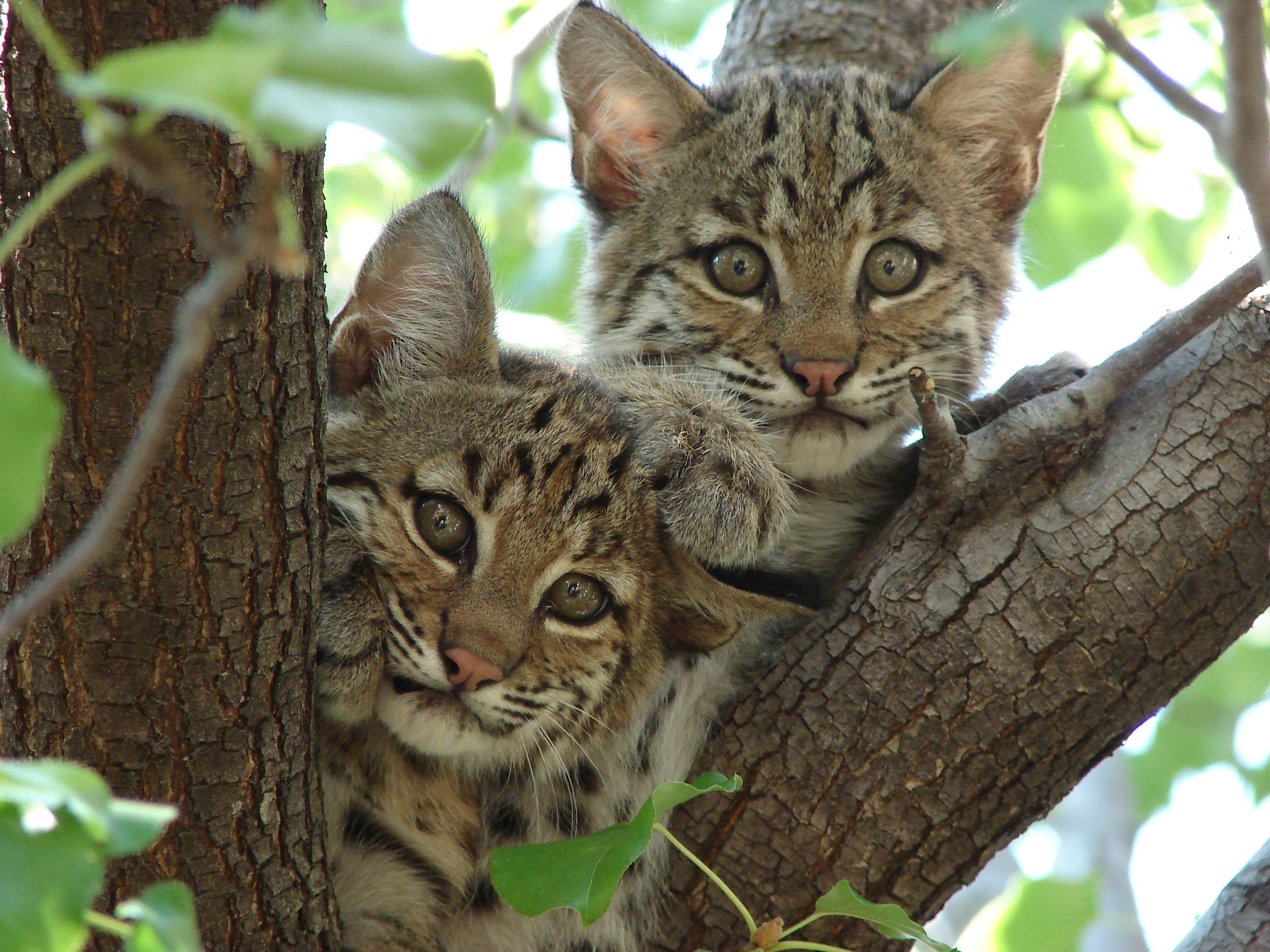
Bobcat kittens in June, about 2–4 months old

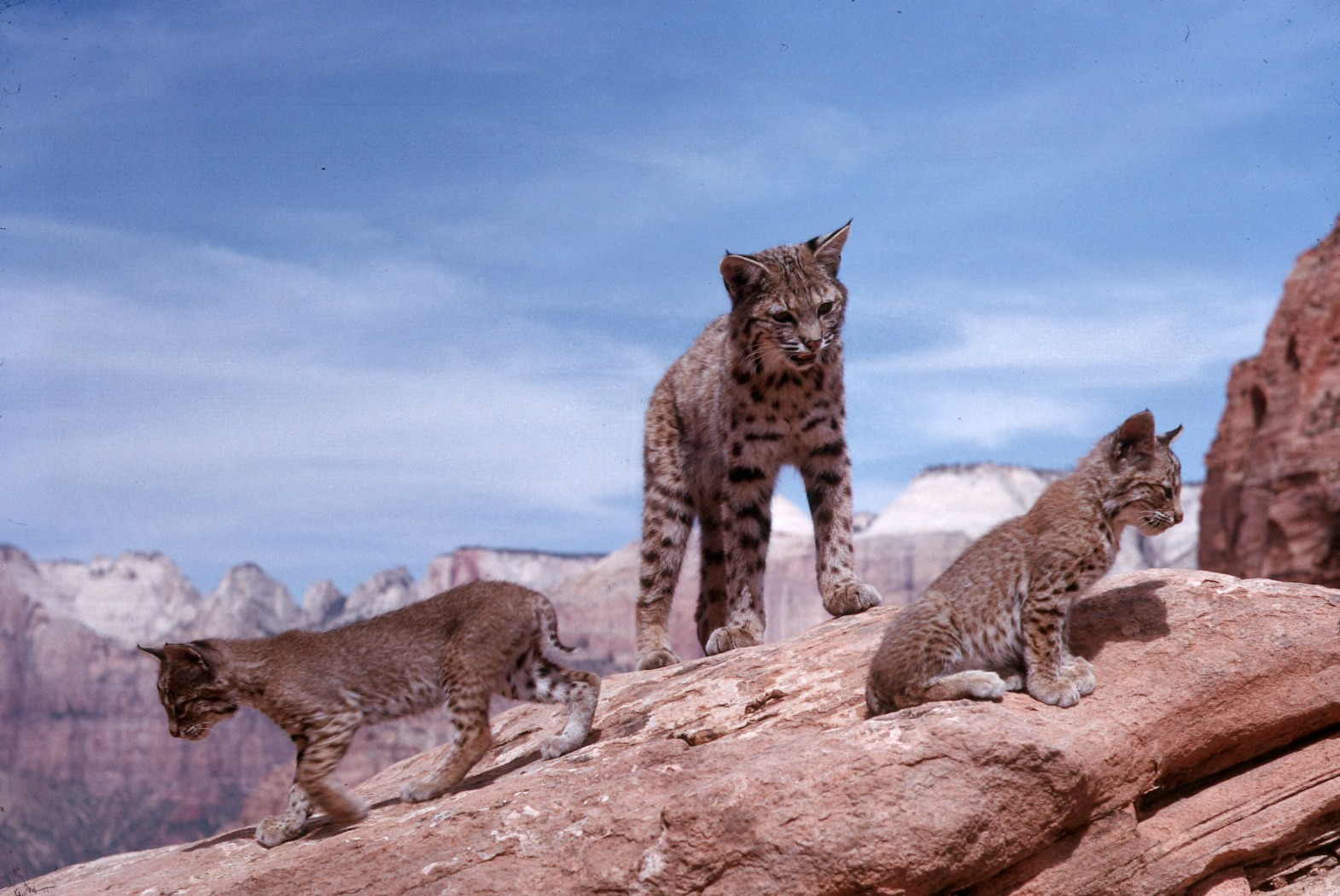
Adult bobcat with two kittens

The average lifespan of the bobcat is seven years but rarely exceeds 10 years. The oldest wild bobcat on record was 16 years old, and the oldest captive bobcat lived to be 32.

Bobcats generally begin breeding by their second summer, though females may start as early as their first year. Sperm production begins each year by September or October, and the male is fertile into the summer. A dominant male travels with a female and mates with her several times, generally from winter until early spring; this varies by location, but most mating takes place during February and March. The pair may undertake a number of different behaviors, including bumping, chasing, and ambushing.

Other males may be in attendance, but remain uninvolved. Once the male recognizes the female is receptive, he grasps her in the typical felid neck grip and mates with her. The female may later go on to mate with other males, and males generally mate with several females. During courtship, the bobcat's vocalizations include screaming and hissing. Research in Texas revealed that establishing a home range is necessary for breeding; studied animals without a home range had no identified offspring. The female has an estrous cycle of 44 days, with the estrus lasting five to ten days. Bobcats remain reproductively active throughout their lives.

The female raises the young alone. One to six, but usually two to four, kittens are born in April or May, after roughly 60 to 70 days of gestation. Sometimes, a second litter is born as late as September. The female generally gives birth in an enclosed space, usually a small cave or hollow log. The young open their eyes by the ninth or tenth day. They start exploring their surroundings at four weeks and are weaned at about two months. Within three to five months, they begin to travel with their mother. They hunt by themselves by the fall of their first year, and usually disperse shortly thereafter. In Michigan, however, they have been observed staying with their mother as late as the next spring.

=== Predators ===
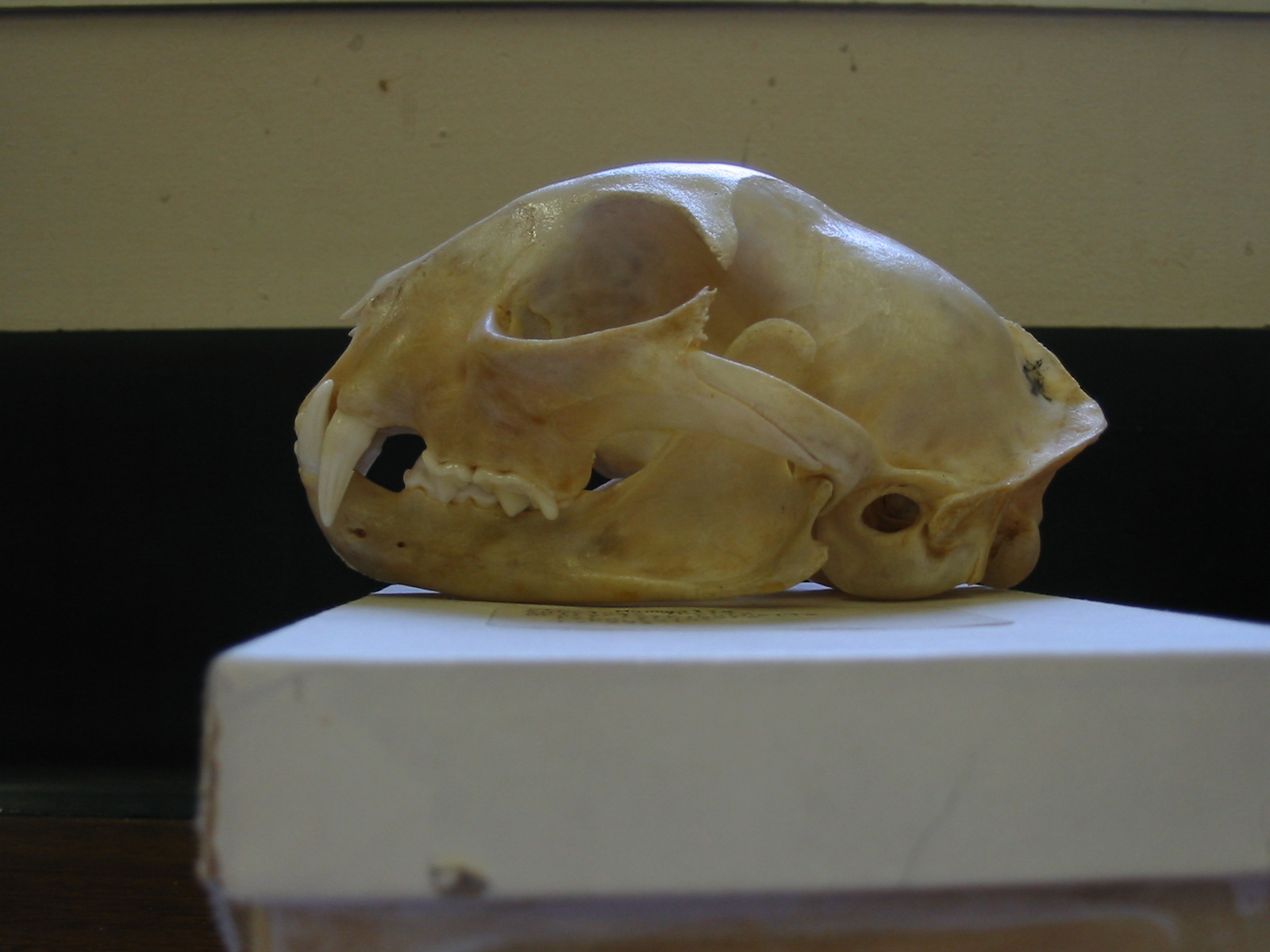
Skull showing large curved canines

The adult bobcat has relatively few predators. Rarely, however, it may be killed in interspecific conflict by several larger predators or fall prey to them. Cougars and gray wolves can kill adult bobcats, a behavior repeatedly observed in Yellowstone National Park. Coyotes have killed adult bobcats and kittens. At least one confirmed observation of a bobcat and an American black bear (Ursus americanus) fighting over a carcass is confirmed. Like other Lynx species, bobcats probably avoid encounters with bears, in part because they are likely to lose kills to them or may rarely be attacked by them. Bobcat remains have occasionally been found in the resting sites of male fishers. American alligators (Alligator mississippensis) have been filmed opportunistically preying on adult bobcats in the southeast United States. Golden eagles (Aquila chrysaetos) have been reportedly observed preying on bobcats.

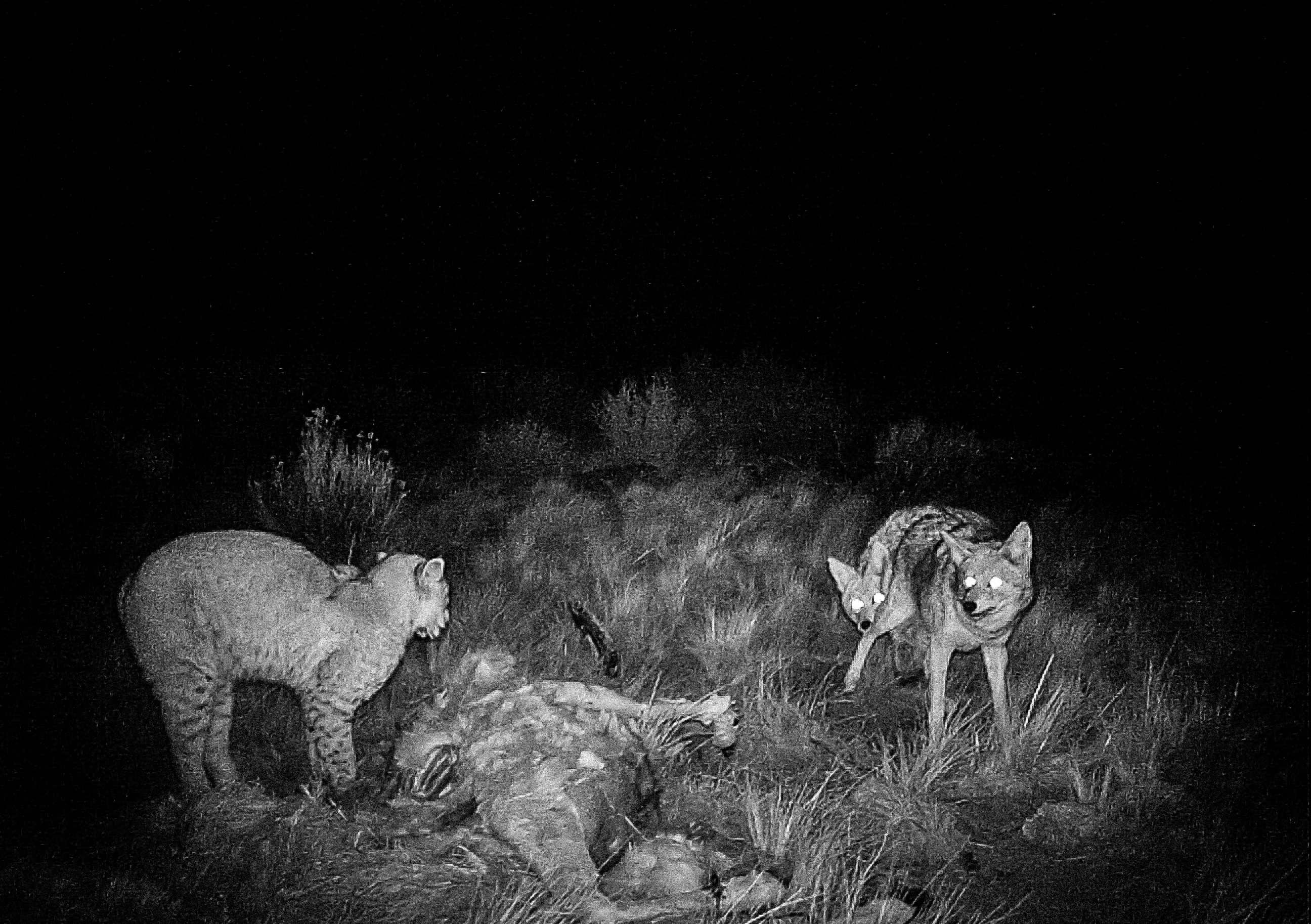
Bobcat defending a kill from a pair of coyotes

Kittens may be taken by several predators, including great horned owls, eagles, foxes, and bears, and other adult male bobcats. When prey populations are not abundant, fewer kittens are likely to reach adulthood.

Diseases, accidents, hunters, automobiles, and starvation are the other leading causes of death. Juveniles show high mortality shortly after leaving their mothers, while still perfecting their hunting techniques. One study of 15 bobcats showed yearly survival rates for both sexes averaged 0.62, in line with other research suggesting rates of 0.56 to 0.67. Cannibalism has been reported; kittens may be taken when prey levels are low, but this is very rare and does not much influence the population.

The bobcat may have external parasites, mostly ticks and fleas, and often carries the parasites of its prey, especially those of rabbits and squirrels. Internal parasites (endoparasites) are especially common in bobcats. One study found an average infection rate of 52% from Toxoplasma gondii, but with great regional variation. One mite in particular, Lynxacarus morlani, has to date been found only on the bobcat. Parasites' and diseases' role in the mortality of the bobcat is still unclear, but they may account for greater mortality than starvation, accidents, and predation.

== Conservation ==
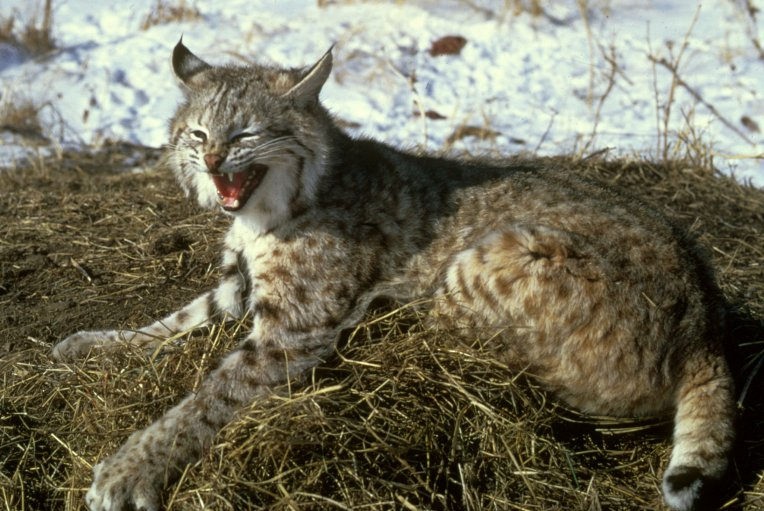
The bobcat population has seen a decline in the American Midwest, but is generally stable and healthy

The bobcat is listed in Appendix II of the Convention on International Trade in Endangered Species of Wild Fauna and Flora (CITES), which means it is not considered threatened with extinction, but that international trade must be closely monitored. The animal is regulated in all three of its range countries and is found in a number of protected areas of the United States, its principal territory. Estimates from the US Fish and Wildlife Service placed bobcat numbers between 700,000 and 1,500,000 in the US in 1988, with increased range and population density suggesting even greater numbers in subsequent years; for these reasons, the U.S. has petitioned CITES to remove the cat from Appendix II. Populations in Canada and Mexico remain stable and healthy. It is listed as least concern on the IUCN Red List, noting it is relatively widespread and abundant, but information from southern Mexico is poor.

The bobcat is considered endangered in Ohio, Indiana, and New Jersey. It was removed from the threatened list of Illinois in 1999 and of Iowa in 2003. In Pennsylvania, limited hunting and trapping are once again allowed, after having been banned from 1970 to 1999. The bobcat also suffered population decline in New Jersey at the turn of the 19th century, mainly because of commercial and agricultural developments causing habitat fragmentation; by 1972, the bobcat was given full legal protection and was listed as endangered in the state in 1991. The Mexican bobcat L. r. escuinipae was for a time considered endangered by the US Fish and Wildlife Service, but was delisted in 2005. Between 2003 and 2011, a reduction in bobcat sightings in the Everglades by 87.5% has been attributed to predation by the invasive Burmese python.

The bobcat has long been valued both for fur and sport; it has been hunted and trapped by humans, but has maintained a high population, even in the southern United States, where it is extensively hunted. In the 1970s and 1980s, an unprecedented rise in price for bobcat fur caused further interest in hunting, but by the early 1990s, prices had dropped significantly. Regulated hunting continues, with half of mortality of some populations being attributed to this cause. As a result, the rate of bobcat deaths is skewed in winter, when hunting season is generally open.

Urbanization can result in the fragmentation of contiguous natural landscapes into patchy habitat within an urban area. Animals that live in these fragmented areas often have reduced movement between the habitat patches, which can lead to reduced gene flow and pathogen transmission between patches. Animals such as the bobcat are particularly sensitive to fragmentation because of their large home ranges. A study in coastal Southern California has shown bobcat populations are affected by urbanization, creation of roads, and other developments. The populations may not be declining as much as predicted, but instead the connectivity of different populations is affected. This leads to a decrease in natural genetic diversity among bobcat populations. For bobcats, preserving open space in sufficient quantities and quality is necessary for population viability. Educating residents about the animals is critical as well for conservation in urban areas.

In bobcats using urban habitats in California, the use of rodenticides has been linked to both secondary poisoning by consuming poisoned rats and mice and to increased rates of severe mite infestation (known as notoedric mange), as an animal with a poison-weakened immune system is less capable of fighting off mange. Liver autopsies in California bobcats that have succumbed to notoedric mange have revealed chronic rodenticide exposure. Alternative rodent control measures such as vegetation control and use of traps have been suggested to alleviate this issue.

== Importance in human culture ==
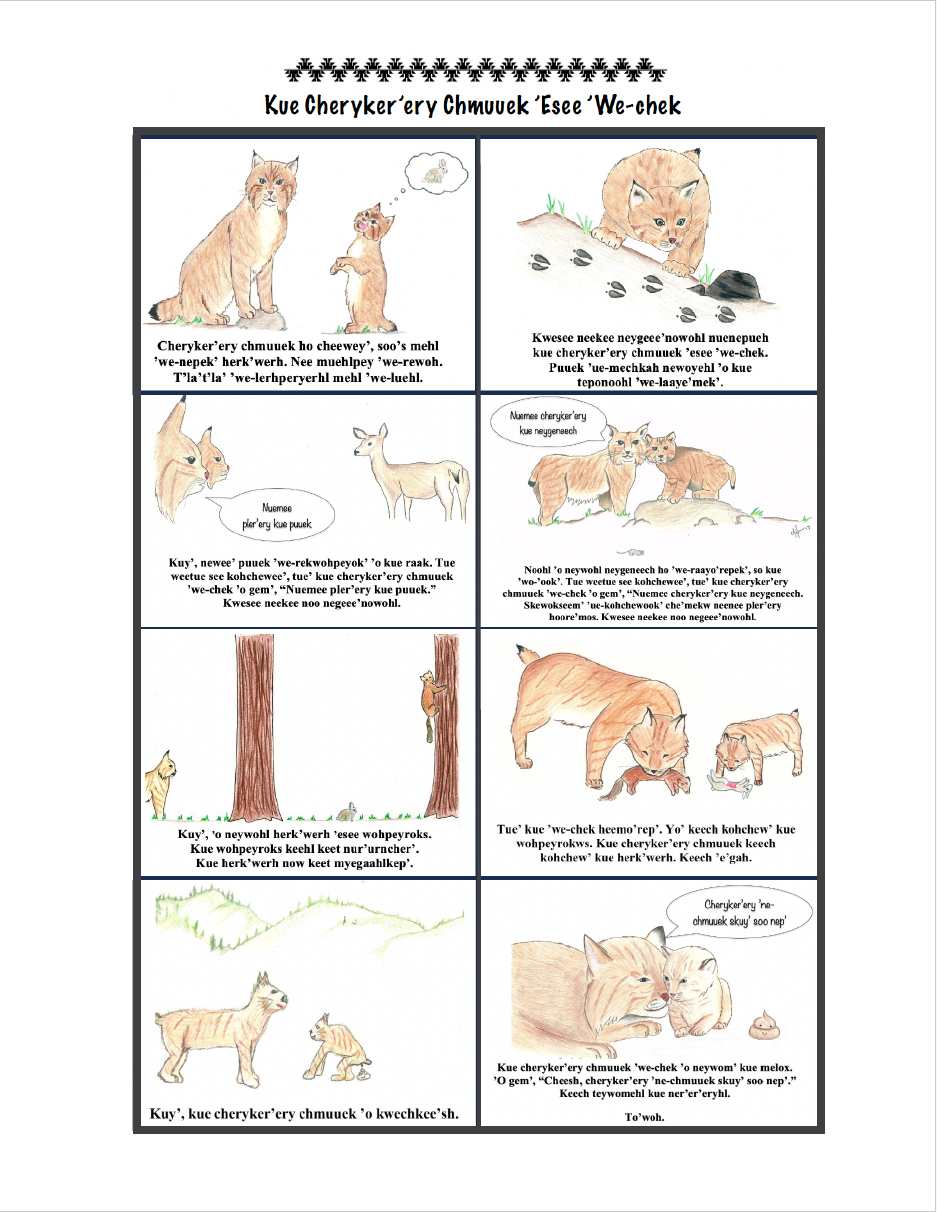
Illustrated story in the Yurok language (native to northwest California) about a bobcat and her kitten

Stories featuring the bobcat, in many variations, are found in some Indigenous cultures of North America, with parallels in South America. A story from the Nez Perce, for instance, depicts the bobcat and coyote as opposed, antithetical beings. However, another version represents them with equality and identicality. Claude Lévi-Strauss argues that the former concept, that of twins representing opposites, is an inherent theme in New World mythologies, but that they are not equally balanced figures, representing an open-ended dualism rather than the symmetric duality of Old World cultures. The latter notion, then, Lévi-Strauss suggests, is the result of regular contact between Europeans and native cultures. Additionally, the version found in the Nez Perce story is of much greater complexity, while the version of equality seems to have lost the tale's original meaning.

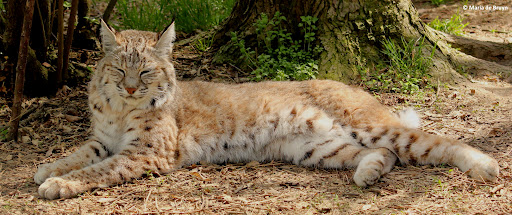
Female bobcat at the Carolina Tiger Rescue.

In a Shawnee tale, the bobcat is outwitted by a rabbit, which gives rise to its spots. After trapping the rabbit in a tree, the bobcat is persuaded to build a fire, only to have the embers scattered on its fur, leaving it singed with dark brown spots. The Mohave people believed dreaming habitually of beings or objects would afford them their characteristics as supernatural powers. Dreaming of two deities, cougar and lynx, they thought, would grant them the superior hunting skills of other tribes. European-descended inhabitants of the Americas also admired the cat, both for its ferocity and its grace, and in the United States, it "rests prominently in the anthology of ... national folklore".

Grave artifacts from dirt domes excavated in the 1980s along the Illinois River revealed a complete skeleton of a young bobcat along with a collar made of bone pendants and shell beads that had been buried by the Hopewell culture. The type and place of burial indicate a tamed and cherished pet or possible spiritual significance. The Hopewell normally buried their dogs, so the bones were initially identified as remains of a puppy. Still, dogs were usually buried close to the village and not in the mounds themselves. This is the only wild cat-decorated burial on the archaeological record.

An inhabitant of Appalachia, Lynx rufus is immortalized (along with university founder Rufus Putnam) at Ohio University through its popular college mascot, Rufus the Bobcat.

== See also ==
- Iberian lynx
