= Filaroides =

Scientific classification
- Kingdom: Animalia
- Phylum: Nematoda
- Class: Chromadorea
- Order: Rhabditida
- Family: Filaroididae
- Genus: Filaroides van Beneden, 1858

Genus of roundworms

Filaroides is a genus of nematodes belonging to the family Filaroididae.

The species of this genus are found in Northern America.

Species:

- Filaroides arator Chandler, 1931
- Filaroides hirthi Georgi & Anderson, 1975
- Filaroides martis (Werner, 1782)
- Filaroides milksi Whitlock, 1956
- Filaroides osleri Cobbold, 1879
