= Molineidae =

Scientific classification
- Kingdom: Animalia
- Phylum: Nematoda
- Class: Chromadorea
- Order: Rhabditida
- Suborder: Strongylida
- Family: Molineidae; Skryabin & Schulz, 1937

Family of roundworms

Molineidae is a family of nematodes belonging to the order Rhabditida.

== Genera ==
Genera:

- Angulocirrus Biocca & Le Roux, 1957
- Anoplostrongylus Boulenger, 1926
- Asymmetracantha Mawson, 1960
- ???Bakeria Moravec & Sey, 1986
- Biacantha Wolfgang, 1954
- Bradypostrongylus Price, 1928
- Brevigraphidium Freitas & Mendonça, 1960
- Brygoonema Durette-Desset & Chabaud, 1981
- Caenostrongylus Lent & Freitas, 1938
- Carostrongylus Durette-Desset & Vaucher, 1989
- Cheiropteronema Sandground, 1929
- ???Delicata Travassos, 1935
- Dollfusstrongylus Quentin, 1970
- Dromaeostrongylus Lubimow, 1933
- Filicapitis Travassos, 1949
- Fontesia Travassos, 1928
- Graphidiops Lent & Freitas, 1938
- Hadrostrongylus Lux Hoppe & do Nascimento, 2007
- Hepatojarakus Yeh, 1955
- Histiostrongylus Molin, 1861
- Hugotnema Durette-Desset & Chabaud, 1981
- Johnpearsonia Durette-Desset, Ben Slimane, Cassone, Barton & Chabaud, 1994
- Kentropyxia Baker, 1982
- Lamanema Becklund, 1963
- Maciela Travassos, 1935
- Mackerrastrongylus Mawson, 1960
- Macuahuitloides Jiménez, Peralta-Rodríguez, Caspeta-Mandujano & Ramírez-Díaz, 2014
- Moennigia Travassos, 1935
- Molineus Cameron, 1923
- Molinostrongylus Skarbilovitch, 1934
- Molostrongylus Durette-Desset & Vaucher, 1996
- Murielus Dikmans, 1939
- Nematodirella Yorke & Maplestone, 1926
- Nematodiroides Bernard, 1965
- Nematodirus Ransom, 1907
- Neohistiostrongylus Barus & Valle, 1967
- Nochtia Travassos & Vogelsang, 1929
- Nycteridostrongylus Baylis, 1930
- Ollulanus Leuckart, 1865
- Ortleppstrongylus Durette-Desset, 1970
- Oswaldocruzia Travassos, 1917
- Paragraphidium Freitas & Mendonca, 1960
- Parahistiostrongylus Pérez Vigueras, 1940
- Pithecostrongylus Lubimov, 1930
- Poekilostrongylus Schmidt & Whittaker, 1975
- Ragenema Slimane, Chabaud & Durette-Desset, 1996
- Rauschia Durette-Desset, 1979
- Schulzia Travassos, 1937
- Shattuckius Sandground, 1938
- Spinostrongylus Travassos, 1935
- Sprattellus Durette-Desset & Cassone, 1981
- Tachynema Durette-Desset & Cassone, 1983
- Tadaridanema Falcón-Ordaz, Guzmán-Cornejo, García-Prieto & Gardner, 2006
- Tasmanema Durette-Desset & Cassone, 1983
- Tenuostrongylus Leroux, 1933
- Tetrabothriostrongylus Mawson, 1960
- Torrestrongylus Vigueras, 1935
- Trichochenia Kou, 1958
- Trichohelix Ortlepp, 1922
- Tricholeiperia Travassos, 1935
- Trichoskrjabinia Travassos, 1937
- Trifurcata Schulz, 1926
- Tupaiostrongylus Dunn, 1963
- Typhlopsia Barus & Coy Otero, 1978
- Zaglonema Durette-Desset & Beveridge, 1981
