= Crenosomatidae =

Scientific classification
- Domain: Eukaryota
- Kingdom: Animalia
- Phylum: Nematoda
- Class: Chromadorea
- Order: Rhabditida
- Superfamily: Metastrongyloidea
- Family: Crenosomatidae

Family of roundworms

Crenosomatidae is a family of nematodes belonging to the order Rhabditida.

Genera:

- Crenosoma Molin, 1861
- Molinofilaria Vuylsteke, 1956
- Otostrongylus de Bruyn, 1933
- Paracrenosoma Yun & Kontramavichus, 1963
- Prestwoodia Anderson, 1978
- Troglostrongylus Vevers, 1923
