= Molineus =

Scientific classification
- Kingdom: Animalia
- Phylum: Nematoda
- Class: Chromadorea
- Order: Rhabditida
- Family: Molineidae
- Genus: Molineus; Cameron, 1923

Genus of roundworms

Molineus is a genus of nematodes belonging to the family Molineidae.

The species of this genus are found in Eurasia and America.

Species:

- Molineus africanus
- Molineus albignaci
