= Schulzia (plant) =

Scientific classification
- Kingdom: Plantae
- Clade: Tracheophytes
- Clade: Angiosperms
- Clade: Eudicots
- Clade: Asterids
- Order: Apiales
- Family: Apiaceae
- Subfamily: Apioideae
- Tribe: Pyramidoptereae
- Genus: Schulzia; Spreng.

Genus of flowering plant

Schulzia is a genus of flowering plants belonging to the family Apiaceae.

Its native range is Central Asia (within Kazakhstan, Kyrgyzstan and Tajikistan,) to Siberia (within Altay, Chita, Irkutsk, Krasnoyarsk, Tuva), Far East Russia (within Amur and Buryatiya) and the Himalayas (within East Himalaya, Mongolia,Nepal, Tibet, West Himalaya and Xinjiang).

The genus name of Schulzia is in honour of Karl Friedrich Schultz (1766–1837), German doctor and botanist, and Johann Heinrich Schulze (1687–1744), a German professor and polymath. It was first described and published by George Bentham in London J. Bot. Vol.4 on page 633 in 1845.

== Known species ==
According to Kew:

- Schulzia albiflora (Kar. & Kir.) Popov
- Schulzia bhutanica M.F.Watson
- Schulzia crinita (Pall.) Spreng.
- Schulzia dissecta (C.B.Clarke) C.Norman
- Schulzia prostrata Pimenov & Kljuykov
- Schulzia tianschanica Lazkov & Kljuykov
