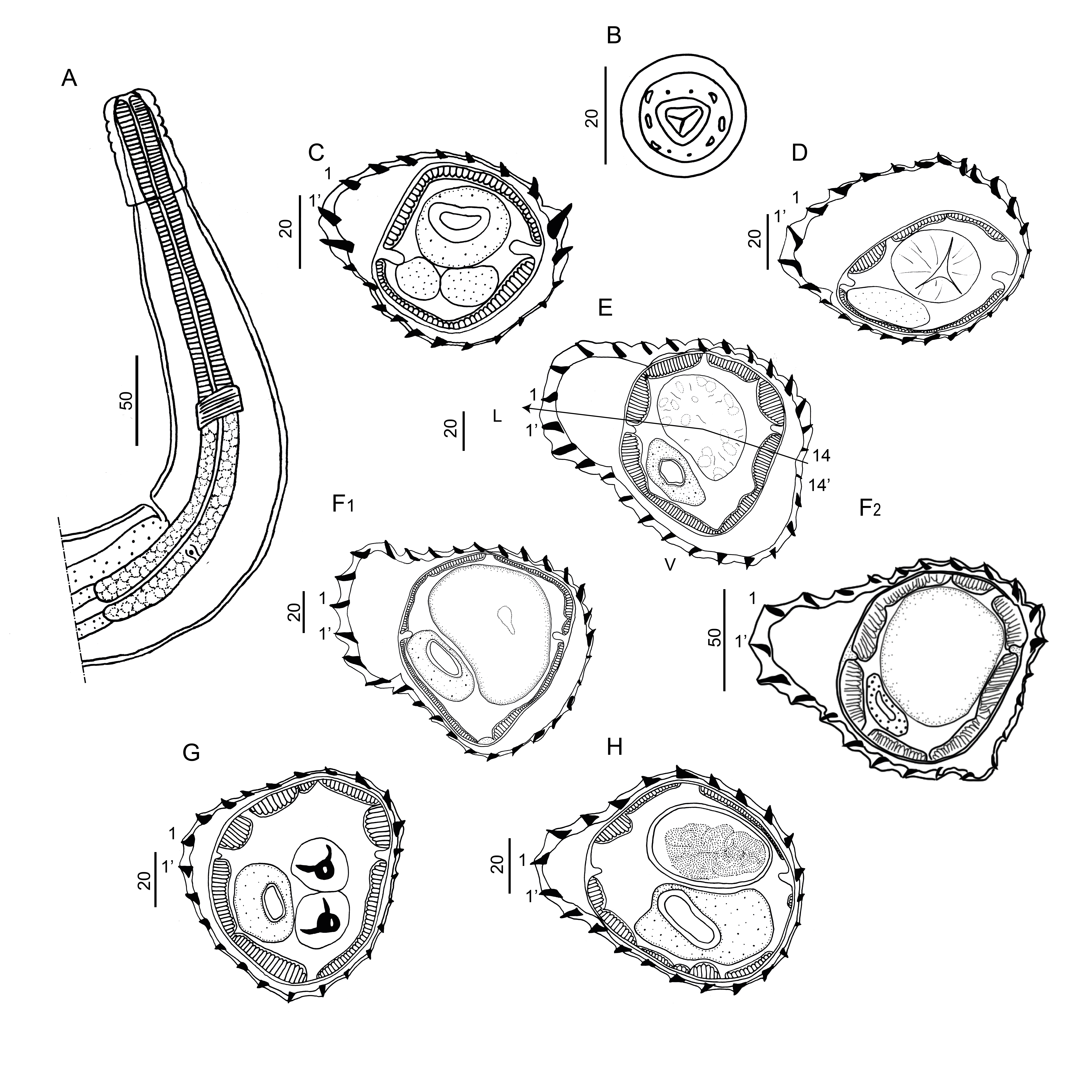
- Hassalstrongylus dollfusi, mainly the synlophe

Scientific classification
- Domain: Eukaryota
- Kingdom: Animalia
- Phylum: Nematoda
- Class: Chromadorea
- Order: Rhabditida
- Family: Heligmonellidae
- Genus: Hassalstrongylus; Durette-Desset, 1971

Type species
- Longistriata adunca Chandler, 1932

Species
- See text

= Hassalstrongylus =

Genus of roundworms

Hassalstrongylus is a genus of nematode worms that infect mostly muroid rodents from eastern North America to South America. The genus is part of the Heligmonellidae and related to genera like Stilestrongylus.

- Hassalstrongylus aduncus (Sigmodon hispidus, Rattus sp.)
- Hassalstrongylus argentinus
- Hassalstrongylus beta
- Hassalstrongylus bocqueti (Oryzomys couesi, Handleyomys melanotis, Oligoryzomys fulvescens)
- Hassalstrongylus chabaudi (Wiedomys pyrrhorhinos)
- Hassalstrongylus dessetae (Neacomys sp.)
- Hassalstrongylus dollfusi (Mus musculus)
- Hassalstrongylus echalieri (Oryzomyini sp.)
- Hassalstrongylus epsilon (Nectomys squamipes, Akodon cursor)
- Hassalstrongylus forresteri (Note: Durette-Desset transferred Longistriata musculi Dikmans, 1935, to Hassalstrongylus in 1972, but in 1974 recognized that she had based her earlier opinion on material that was not referable to H. musculi, but to a new species which she named H. forresteri.)
- Hassalstrongylus hoineffae (Oligoryzomys nigripes, Calomys callosus, Wiedomys pyrrhorhinos)
- Hassalstrongylus lichtenfelsi
- Hassalstrongylus mazzai
- Hassalstrongylus musculi (Oryzomys couesi, Handleyomys melanotis, Oligoryzomys fulvescens)
- Hassalstrongylus proechimysi
- Hassalstrongylus puntanus (Graomys griseoflavus)
- Hassalstrongylus schadi
- Hassalstrongylus zeta (Galea spixii, Cerradomys subflavus, Nectomys squamipes, Oligoryzomys nigripes, Akodon cursor, Euryoryzomys russatus)

The proposed species Hassalstrongylus multiovatus, described from Akodon simulator, is a synonym of Trichofreitasia lenti from Oligoryzomys flavescens.

== Literature cited ==
- Denke, M.D. 1977. Quatre nouveaux nématodes heligmosomes parasites du rongeurs du Mexique. Bulletin du Muséum National d'Histoire Naturelle (Zoologie) 327:777–787.
- Diaw, O.T. 1976. Contribution à l'étude de nématodes Trichostrongyloidea parasites de xenarthre, marsupiaux et rongeurs néotropicaux. Bulletin du Muséum National d'Histoire Naturelle (Zoologie) 282:1065–1089.
- Digiani, M.C.; Durette-Desset, M.C. (2003). "Two new species of Nippostrongylinae (Nematoda: Trichostrongylina: Heligmonellidae) from the grey leaf-eared mouse Graomys griseoflavus(Sigmodontinae) in Argentina". Parasite. 10 (1): 21–29. doi:10.1051/parasite/2003101p21. PMID 12669346.
- Digiani, M.C., Navone, G.T. and Durette-Desset, M.-C. 2007. The systematic position of some nippostrongyline nematodes (Trichostrongylina: Heligmosomoidea) parasitic in Argentinean sigmodontine rodents. Systematic Parasitology 67(2):87–92.
- Durette-Desset, M.C. 1971. Essai de classification des nématodes héligmosomes. Correlations avec la paléobiogéographie des hôtes. Mémoires du Muséum National d'Histoire Naturelle, Paris (A)69:1–126.
- Durette-Desset, Marie-Claude (1974). "Nippostrongylinae (Nematoda : Heligmosomidae) néarctiques". Annales de Parasitologie Humaine et Comparée. 49 (4): 435–450. doi:10.1051/parasite/1974494435. ISSN 0003-4150. PMID 4457031.
- Durette-Desset, M.-C. and Digiani, M.C. 2005. Systematic position of some Nearctic Heligmosomoidea (Nematoda: Trichostrongylina) from the U.S. National Parasite Collection and their description (subscription required). Journal of Parasitology 91(4):893-899.
- Gomes, D.C., Cruz, R.P. da, Vicente, J.J. and Pinto, R.M. 2003. Nematode parasites of marsupials and small rodents from the Brazilian Atlantic Forest in the State of Rio de Janeiro, Brazil. Revista Brasileira de Zoologia 20(4):699–707.
- Magalhaes Pinto, R. 1978. Sobre Hassalstrongylus dessetae sp. n. (Nematoda, Trichostrongyloidea). Atas da Sociedade de Biologia do Rio de Janeiro 19(1):59–61 (in Portuguese).
- Magalhaes Pinto, R. and Correa Gomes, D. 1980. Contribuicao ao conhecimento da fauna helmintologica da Regiao Amazonica. Nematodeos. Atas da Sociedade de Biologia do Rio de Janeiro 21(1):65–74 (in Portuguese).
- Maldonado, J.A., Gentile, R., Fernandes-Moraes, C.C., D'Andrea, P.S., Lanfredi, R.M. and Rey, L. 2006. Helminth communities of Nectomys squamipes naturally infected by the exotic trematode Schistosoma mansoni in southeastern Brazil. Journal of Helminthology 80(4):369–375.
- Pérez-Ponce de Léon, G., Gardner, S.L. and Falcón-Ordáz, J. 2000. Phylogenetic relationships among species of Stilestrongylus Freitas, Lent and Almeida, 1937 (Trichostrongyloidea: Heligmonellidae: Nippostrongylinae), parasites of myomorph rodents (Rodentia: Muridae) in the Neotropics. Journal of Parasitology 86(6):1326–1335.
- Underwood, H.T., Owen, J.G. and Engstrom, M.D. 1986. Endohelminths of three species of Oryzomys (Rodentia: Cricetidae) from San Luis Potosi, Mexico (subscription required). The Southwestern Naturalist 31(3):410–411.
