= A. cursor =

A. cursor may refer to:

- Abacetus cursor, a ground beetle
- Akodon cursor, the cursor grass mouse, found in South America
