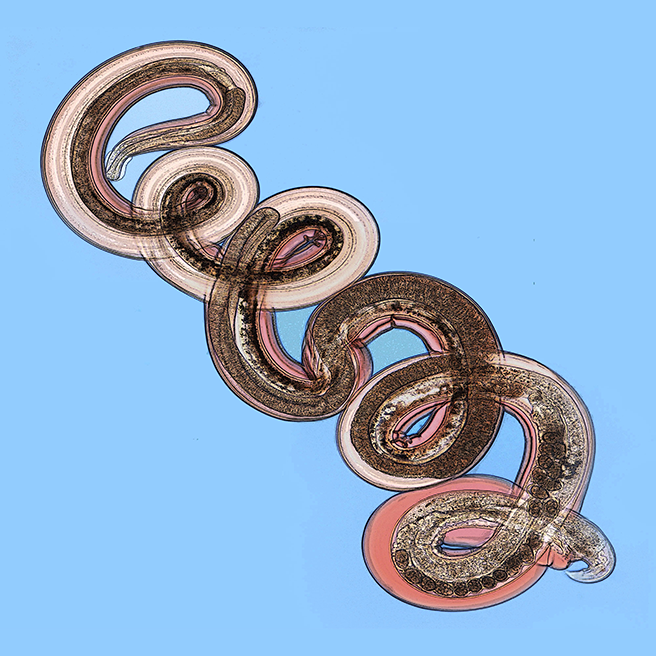

Scientific classification
- Kingdom: Animalia
- Phylum: Nematoda
- Class: Chromadorea
- Order: Rhabditida
- Suborder: Strongylida
- Superfamily: Trichostrongyloidea
- Family: Heligmonellidae
- Subfamily: Nippostrongylinae
- Genus: Nippostrongylus
- Species: N. brasiliensis

Binomial name
- Nippostrongylus brasiliensis (Travassos, 1914)

Synonyms
- Heligmosomum brasiliensis Travassos, 1914

= Nippostrongylus brasiliensis =

Species of roundworm

Nippostrongylus brasiliensis is a gastrointestinal roundworm that infects rodents, primarily rats. This worm is a widely studied parasite due to its simple lifecycle and its ability to be used in animal models. Its lifecycle is similar to the human hookworms Necator americanus and Ancylostoma duodenale, taking five molting stages to become sexually mature.

== Lifecycle ==
Eggs located within the soil release motile, free-living worms that must moult twice (L1 and L2) to develop into their infective L3 stage. This L3 stage can penetrate through intact skin in as little as four hours. Once inside the host, the worms invade the venous circulation and are carried into the lungs, where they become trapped in the capillaries. When the worms mature into the L4 stage, they rupture the capillaries and are released into the alveoli, where they are coughed up and swallowed. They then reach the small intestines 3–4 days after the initial infection. The worms become adults after the final molt into the L5 stage, where they begin laying eggs on day 6 of infection. The eggs are passed out of the host through feces and the cycle starts all over again.

N. brasiliensis is adapted to infecting rats, so can continue laying eggs for prolonged periods of time. The immune response of mice, however, leads to cessation of egglaying by day 8 and adults are expelled by day 10.

== Animal model ==
N. brasiliensis provides a valuable lab model in determining the migration pathway through the host. The lifecycle of N. brasiliensis can be passed through lab mice. The availability of inbred and mutant mouse strains can be advantageous when examining the genetic basis of murine susceptibility and resistance to infection. Animal models of N. brasiliensis infections can lead to a better understanding of the basic biology of the immune response and protective immunity. For instance, they can provide the model for induction and maintenance of Th2-type immune responses and exhibit all the characteristics for eosinophilia, mastocytosis, mucus production, and CD4 T cell–dependent IgE production. An infection model of N. brasiliensis has been used to determine that at least two distinct Th2-type immune responses occur—one that is thymic stromal lymphopoietin–dependent, and one that is type-1 interferon-dependent.

Lab cultures of N. brasiliensis are maintained by serial passage in rats. Thousands L3 larvae are given to several mice. In a few days, each rat will poop out hundreds of thousands of eggs. The feces is used to set up a fecal culture at 26 °C. Larvae begin to hatch; in the L3 stage they can stay alive in such a culture for at least four weeks. The L3 worms are then collected using an adapted Baermann apparatus, and the cycle repeats.

== Genome ==
The 50 Helminth Genomes Initiative by Wellcome Trust Sanger Institute (WTSI) released a fragmented reference genome 294,400 kb in size. A 2018 MiniION long read sequencing project showed the diversity found in a single culture line of worms and demonstrated some methods to correct for nanopore sequencing errors. As of November 2024, NCBI lists ASM3055315v1 from 2021–2023 as the reference genome of the species. This new reference genome from Cornell University shows five autosomes and 1 X chromosome, spanning 257.4 megabases in 327 contigs.

== Symptoms and diseases ==
Lab mice previously infected with N. brasiliensis develop massive emphysema with dilation of distal airspaces due to the loss of alveolar septa; N. brasiliensis infection can result in deterioration of the lung, destruction to the alveoli, and long-term airway hyperresponsiveness, which is consistent with emphysema and chronic obstructive pulmonary disorder (COPD). This infection can lead to a chronic low level hemorrhaging of the lung. The damage to the lung tissue can result in the development of COPD and emphysema. Among respiratory problems, a N. brasiliensis infection can also result in the loss of both body mass and red blood cell density. Biphasic anorexia is also prevalent in laboratory rats infected with this parasite. The first phase coincides with the parasite's invasion of the lung and the second phase occurs when the parasite matures inside the intestine.

Infection in mice causes impairment of reference memory, but neither impairs learning nor lead to anxiety.

== Treatment ==
Tetramisole loaded into zeolite is more effective at killing adults of N. brasiliensis in rats than tetramisole alone.

== See also ==
- Heligmosomoides polygyrus
- Trichuris muris
