= Hassalstrongylus forresteri =

Scientific classification
- Domain: Eukaryota
- Kingdom: Animalia
- Phylum: Nematoda
- Class: Chromadorea
- Order: Rhabditida
- Family: Heligmonellidae
- Genus: Hassalstrongylus
- Species: H. forresteri

Binomial name
- Hassalstrongylus forresteri Durette-Desset, 1974

Species of roundworm

Hassalstrongylus forresteri is a nematode worm of the genus Hassalstrongylus that infects the marsh rice rat (Oryzomys palustris) in the United States. It was first described as Hassalstrongylus musculi by Marie-Claude Durette-Desset in 1972, but she later recognized it as a different species, H. forresteri. The females cannot be distinguished from those of the other species in the marsh rice rat, H. musculi and H. lichtenfelsi.

== See also ==
- List of parasites of the marsh rice rat

== Literature cited ==
- Diaw, O.T. 1976. Contribution a l'etude de nematodes Trichostrongyloidea parasites de xenarthre, marsupiaux et rongeurs neotropicaux. Bulletin de la Muséum National de la Histoire Naturel de Paris (Zoologie) 282:1065–1089.
- Kinsella, J.M. 1988. Comparison of helminths of rice rats, Oryzomys palustris, from freshwater and saltwater marshes in Florida. Proceedings of the Helminthological Society of Washington 55(2):275–280.
