= Hassalstrongylus lichtenfelsi =

Scientific classification
- Domain: Eukaryota
- Kingdom: Animalia
- Phylum: Nematoda
- Class: Chromadorea
- Order: Rhabditida
- Family: Heligmonellidae
- Genus: Hassalstrongylus
- Species: H. lichtenfelsi

Binomial name
- Hassalstrongylus lichtenfelsi Durette-Desset, 1974

Species of roundworm

Hassalstrongylus lichtenfelsi is a nematode worm of the genus Hassalstrongylus that infects the marsh rice rat (Oryzomys palustris) in Florida. The females cannot be distinguished from those of the other species in the marsh rice rat, H. forresteri and H. musculi.

== See also ==
- List of parasites of the marsh rice rat

== Literature cited ==
- Diaw, Oumar Talla, 1976. Contribution à l'étude de nematodes Trichostrongyloidea parasites de xenarthre, marsupiaux et rongeurs neotropicaux. Bulletin du Muséum National d'Histoire Naturelle de Paris (Zoologie) 282:1065–1089.
- Durette-Desset, Marie-Claude, 1974. Nippostrongylinae (Nematoda: Heligmosomidae) néarctiques. Annales de Parasitologie Humaine et Comparée 49(4):435–450.
- Kinsella, J.M. 1988. Comparison of helminths of rice rats, Oryzomys palustris, from freshwater and saltwater marshes in Florida. Proceedings of the Helminthological Society of Washington 55(2):275–280.
