= Hassalstrongylus musculi =

Scientific classification
- Domain: Eukaryota
- Kingdom: Animalia
- Phylum: Nematoda
- Class: Chromadorea
- Order: Rhabditida
- Family: Heligmonellidae
- Genus: Hassalstrongylus
- Species: H. musculi

Binomial name
- Hassalstrongylus musculi (Dikmans, 1935)

Species of roundworm

Hassalstrongylus musculi is a nematode worm of the genus Hassalstrongylus that infects the marsh rice rat (Oryzomys palustris) and house mouse (Mus musculus) in the United States and Oryzomys couesi, Oligoryzomys fulvescens, and Handleyomys melanotis in San Luis Potosí, Mexico. It was first described as Longistriata musculi by Dikmans in 1935, but transferred to Hassalstrongylus in 1971 and 1972 by Marie-Claude Durette-Desset. She later renamed the material she had used to describe H. musculi in 1972 as H. forresteri. The females cannot be distinguished from those of the other species in the marsh rice rat, H. forresteri and H. lichtenfelsi.

== See also ==
- List of parasites of the marsh rice rat

== Literature cited ==
- Diaw, O.T. 1976. Contribution a l'etude de nematodes Trichostrongyloidea parasites de xenarthre, marsupiaux et rongeurs neotropicaux. Bulletin de la Muséum National de la Histoire Naturel de Paris (Zoologie) 282:1065–1089.
- Durette-Desset, M.-C. 1974. Nippostrongylinae (Nematoda: Heligmosomidae) nearctiques. Annales Parasit. hum. comp. 49(4):435–450.
- Kinsella, J.M. 1988. Comparison of helminths of rice rats, Oryzomys palustris, from freshwater and saltwater marshes in Florida. Proceedings of the Helminthological Society of Washington 55(2):275–280.
- Underwood, H.T., Owen, J.G. and Engstrom, M.D. 1986. Endohelminths of three species of Oryzomys (Rodentia: Cricetidae) from San Luis Potosi, Mexico (subscription required). The Southwestern Naturalist 31(3):410–411.
