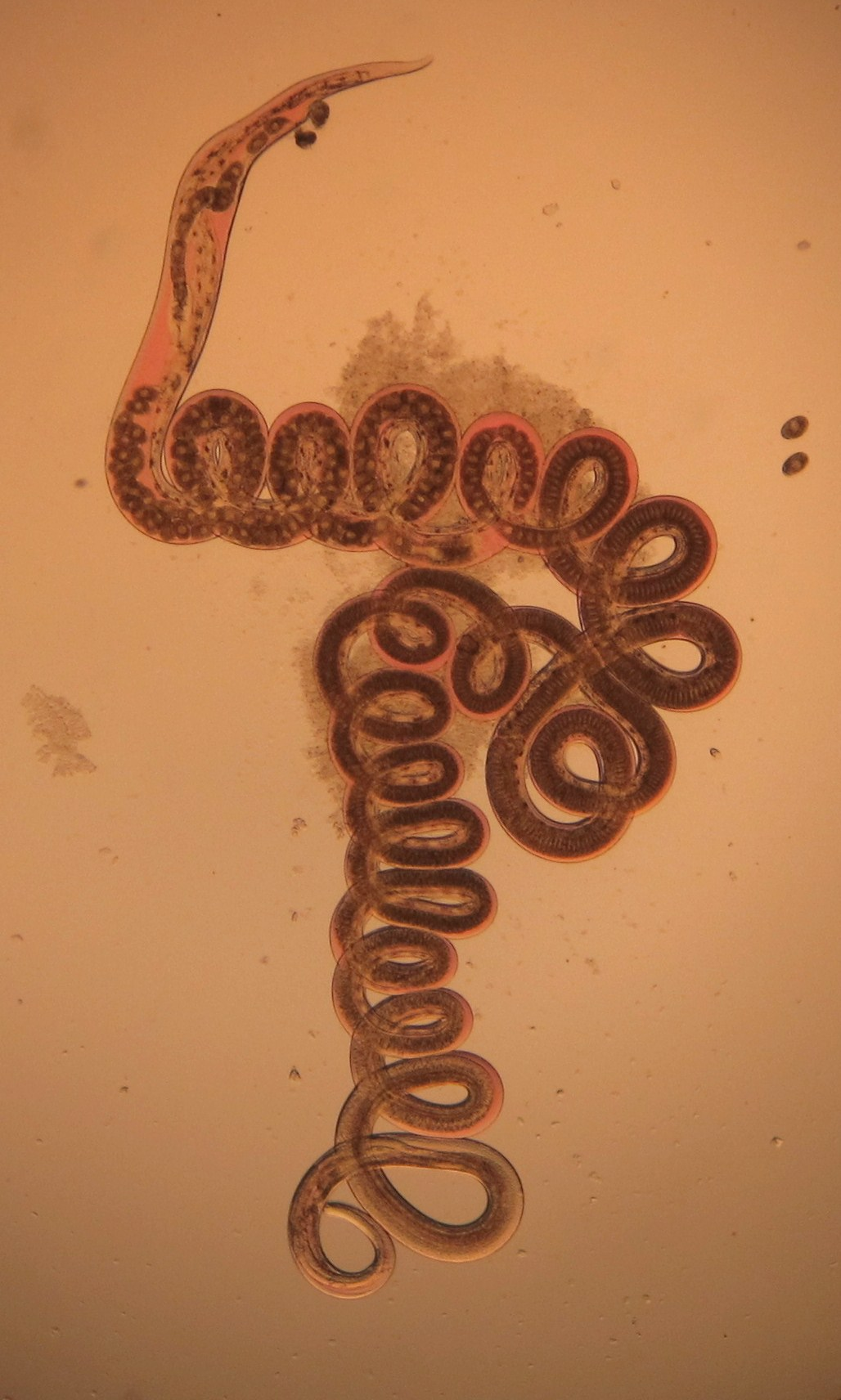
- Female H. polygyrus from the digestive tract of a woodmouse

Scientific classification
- Kingdom: Animalia
- Phylum: Nematoda
- Class: Chromadorea
- Order: Rhabditida
- Family: Heligmosomidae
- Genus: Heligmosomoides
- Species: H. polygyrus

Binomial name
- Heligmosomoides polygyrus (Dujardin, 1845)

Synonyms
- Heligmosomoides linstowi Hall 1916; Nematospiroides dubius Baylis 1926

= Heligmosomoides polygyrus =

Species of roundworm

Heligmosomoides polygyrus is a naturally occurring intestinal roundworm of rodents. It belongs to the family Trychostrongylidae, and male and female worms are morphologically distinguishable. The parasite has a direct lifecycle, with its larval form being the infective stage. H. polygyrus has the ability to establish chronic infections in rodents and alter host immune responses. This nematode is widely used as a gastrointestinal parasitic model in immunological, pharmacological, and toxicological studies.

== Taxonomy ==
The taxon consisted of the following subspecies:

- H. polygyrus polygyrus, found in the Western Palearctic, infects Apodemus wood mice; cannot infect Mus without the help of powerful immunosuppressants. The synonyms N. dubius and H. linstowi both refer to this group.
- H. polygyrus corsicus, found in Turkey and Corsica, infects Mus.
- H. polygyrus bakeri, found in house mice worldwide and Gambel's deer mice in California. All lab strains derive from a population isolated from a Californian Gambel's deer mouse in 1950.
- H. polygyrus americanus, found in a Western heather vole.

In 2006, H. p. bakeri was proposed to be its own full species, Heligmosomoides bakeri, using genetic evidence. A 2010 article presents both genetic and phenotypic evidence. H. p. corsicus is closer to H. bakeri than to H. polygyrus proper under these two criteria, but the subspecies was too badly described to be moved. A 2023 article presents full genomes from both species, unambiguously showing their genetic distance, which amounts to 1 million years of separate evolution.

== Lifecycle and morphology ==
This parasite has a direct lifecycle with no intermediate hosts. The lifecycle takes about 13–15 days to complete. Infected mice pass faeces containing eggs, and egg sizes vary between 70 and 84 micrometres (μm) in length and 37 and 53 μm in width. Eggs are shed from the host at the 8– to 16-cell stage and hatch in the environment, roughly 24 hours after passing through the host. L1 larvae emerge from the egg and measure from 300–600 μm in length. Three lip-like structures can be seen around a rudimentary mouth. L1 larvae moult to L2 larvae after 2–3 days; they then begin feeding on bacteria in the environment. The L1-stage cuticle loosens from either end of the larvae, but remain loosely associated with the L2 larvae, becoming an outer sheath up until infection. After 3 days, the L2 partially moults into ensheathed L3, the infective nonfeeding stage. Infective larval stages measure 480–563 μm long.

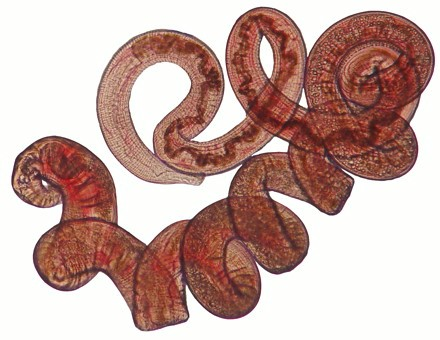
Heligmosomoides polygyrus adult female worm.

Mice ingest the L3 stage of the parasite and after 18 hours, exsheathed L3 appears in the intestinal lumen. The L1 sheath is shed following ingestion, at which point the larvae shorten slightly and measure 376–540 μm in length. After 24 hours since ingestion, larvae invade the mucosal layer of the intestine. Around 4 days after ingestion, L3 moult into L4 in the submucosa of the intestine. At 6 days after ingestion, they encyst in the muscle layer of the intestine and start maturing in to adult parasites. By day 14, adult male and female worms contact in the lumen of the intestine, mate, and produce eggs that are passed in the faeces, thus continuing the lifecycle. Adult males are tightly coiled and usually measure 8–10 mm in length. The females are also tightly coiled, but larger, measuring 18–21mm in length. Adults are characterized by a dark red pigmentation, whereas the free-living larval forms are mostly translucent.

== Epidemiology ==
In natural infections, H. p. polygyrus is found almost ubiquitously within populations of wild wood mice (Apodemus sylvaticus). In one study of wood mouse populations in Oxfordshire, England, 70% of all mice sampled carried an infection with H. p. polygyrus, with an average infection burden of about 12 worms per mouse. Natural infection intensity displays high variability in wood mice, ranging from none to 244 adult worms per mouse. Male and female mice show equal parasitic burdens. Parasite occurrence appears to positively correlate with weight and age of the mouse, showing an increase in prevalence in older, heavier mice. Infection was also seasonally regulated in the wood mouse population, with highest prevalence of infection/worm burden intensity occurring in early spring and reaching their lowest values in late summer/early autumn. This is inversely correlated with typical breeding behaviors of the wood mouse, where the population peaks in late summer or early autumn, and is at its lowest in the early spring.

The bulk of research on H. polygyrus (specifically H. p. bakeri) has been conducted on the laboratory mouse, Mus musculus, as it is used as a model of human helminth infection to which a spectrum of natural resistance to parasite infection exists.

== Pathogenicity ==
Upon infection with H. polygyrus, innate and adaptive host immune responses are generated to prevent the establishment of the parasite in the gut. A strong wound-healing immune response (Th2-type) associated with intestinal pathology is mounted. Similar to other roundworm infections, Th2 immunity focuses on eliminating the parasite or confining it to minimize host damage.

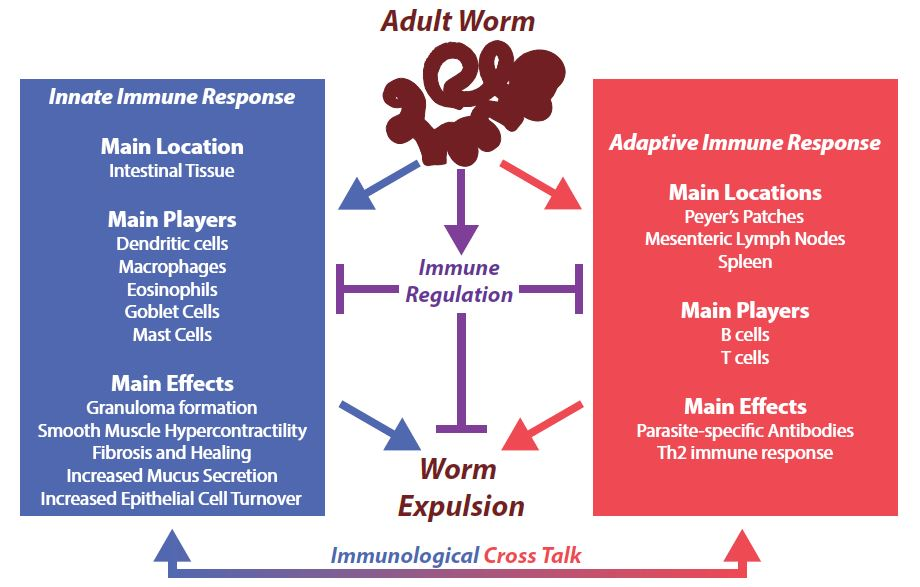
Immunological responses to H. p. bakeri infection and effects of the worm on the immune system.

Mucus secreted by goblet cells of the intestine acts as the first line of defense, hence increases in goblet cell number are a major observable change during H. p. bakeri infection. Macrophages activated through Th2 cytokines play an important role in parasite clearance by increasing intestinal motility and inducing fibrosis and healing. These immune cells are also important in granuloma formation. This is a defensive response by the host to trap the parasite and minimize its damage to the gut. These cells also play a role in increasing contractions of the gut wall, which facilitates worm expulsion. The spleen, mesenteric lymph nodes, Peyer’s patches, and lamina propria lymphocytes induce a strong Th2 immune response by producing different cytokines (Interleukin 3, IL4, IL5, IL9, IL10, and IL13), which are important in controlling and expelling worms. These cytokines aid in generating CD4 T helper 2 effector cells necessary for adaptive immune responses against the parasite. In addition, costimulatory signals via CD80 and CD86 have also been shown important in mounting a Th2 immune response and producing immunoglobulin E (IgE). In the humoral arm of immunity, parasite-specific IgG1 plays a greater role in protection during infection, and IgA has been shown to have a minor effect. IgM and IgE have not been shown to be important in H. p. bakeri protection.

However, despite this impressive immune response, H. p. bakeri is able to hijack the host immune response, dampening the Th2 response generated against itself, resulting in chronic infection. This immune regulation occurs through a strong regulatory T cell response elicited in the spleen and the mesenteric lymph nodes of the host, mainly involving CD25^{+}CD103^{+} regulatory T cells. Another factor might be the production of H. p. bakeris alarmin release inhibitor (A0A3P7XL18), an IL-33-suppressive 26-kDa Sushi domain protein, inhibiting processing of IL33 into its active form. H. p. bakeri also secretes a molecule that is a mimic of TGF-β, termed Hp-TGM (H. polygyrus TGF-β mimic, A0A2D1LW19). Although Hp-TGM has no structural homology to mammalian TGF-β it is similarly able to bind to the TGF-β receptor complex and stimulate downstream signalling processes. These include driving the expression of FOXP3, the master transcription factor of regulatory T cells. Hp-TGM has been shown to induce populations of regulatory T cells in mice that had increased stability in the presence of inflammation in vivo. Hp-TGM can also induce populations of human regulatory T cells from both naive and memory CD4+ T cells that were stable in the presence of inflammation. As such Hp-TGM shows potential for development as a novel therapeutic to re-establish immune tolerance in inflammatory disease.

== Prevention and treatment ==
No formal prevention strategies exist for control of H. polygyrus, although the parasite is susceptible to a number of drug treatments. Treatment of an infected mouse with pyrantel pamoate, ivermectin, or other anthelmintic drugs help clear infection and provide immunity to reinfection. Furthermore, a cocktail of H. p. bakeri excretory-secretory antigens can be collected, and administered to mice in the presence of alum to induce sterilizing immunity before infection.

== See also ==
- Nippostrongylus brasiliensis
- Trichuris muris
