= Heligmosomoides thomomyos =

Scientific classification
- Kingdom: Animalia
- Phylum: Nematoda
- Class: Chromadorea
- Order: Rhabditida
- Family: Heligmosomidae
- Genus: Heligmosomoides
- Species: H. thomomyos

Binomial name
- Heligmosomoides thomomyos Gardner & Jasmer, 1983

Species of roundworm

Heligmosomoides thomomyos is a parasitic nematode. It was identified from the gastrointestinal tract of the Camas pocket gopher (Thomomys bulbivorus).
