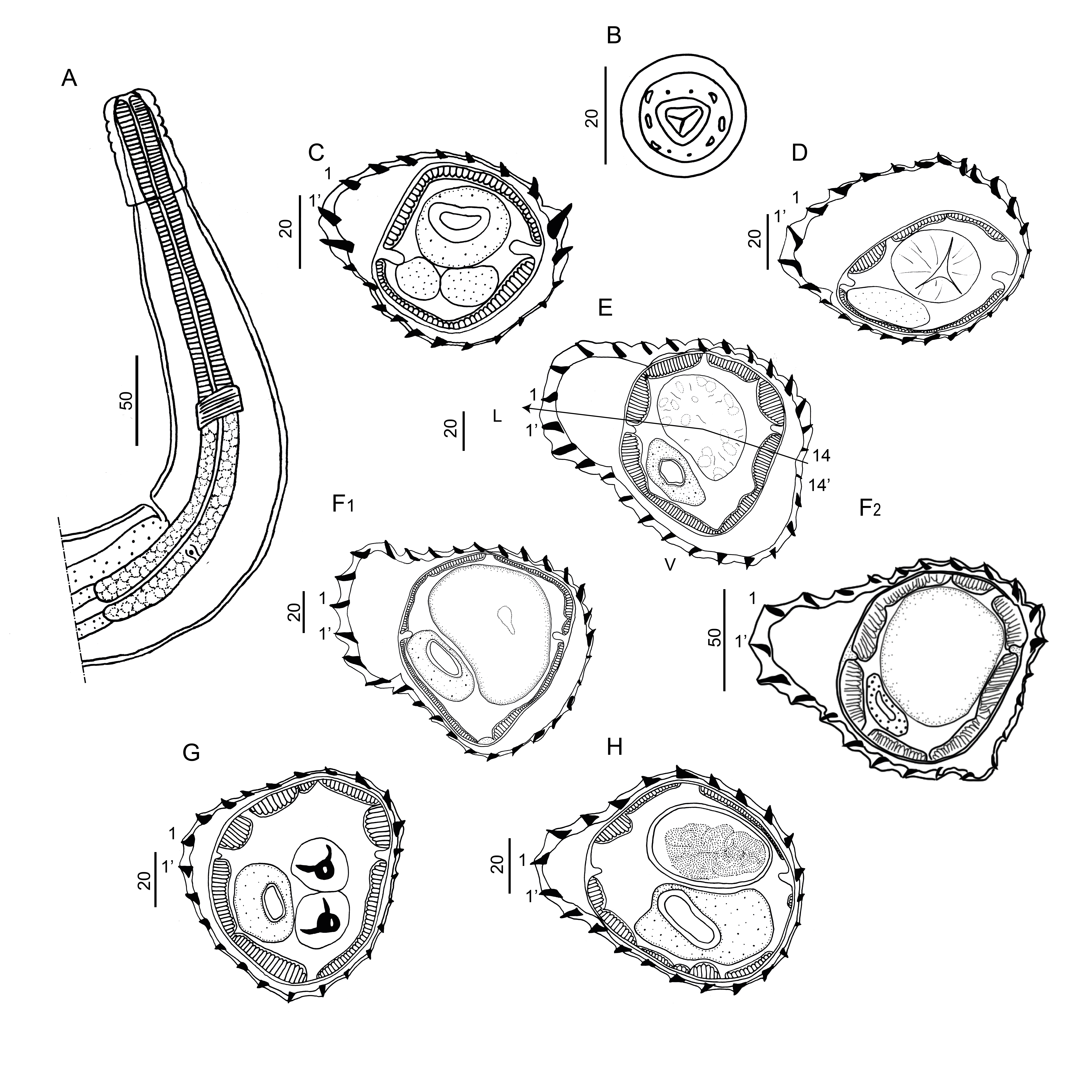
- Hassalstrongylus dollfusi, mainly the synlophe

Scientific classification
- Domain: Eukaryota
- Kingdom: Animalia
- Phylum: Nematoda
- Class: Chromadorea
- Order: Rhabditida
- Family: Heligmonellidae
- Genus: Hassalstrongylus
- Species: H. dollfusi

Binomial name
- Hassalstrongylus dollfusi (Díaz-Ungría, 1963) Durette-Desset, 1971

= Hassalstrongylus dollfusi =

Species of roundworm

Hassalstrongylus dollfusi is a nematode worm of the genus Hassalstrongylus, first described under the name Longistriata dollfusi by Carlos Díaz-Ungría in 1963 who named it dollfusi as an homage to French parasitologist Robert-Philippe Dollfus. The species was transferred to the genus Hassalstrongylus in 1971 by Marie-Claude Durette-Desset. Serrano et al. redescribed the species in 2021.

== Morphology ==
Male organs of Hassalstrongylus dollfusi

Hassalstrongylus dollfusi is a medium-sized nematode (3-10 mm in length), generally uncoiled, sometimes loosely coiled in 1–3 spirals.{}

According to Serrano et al. (2021), characters of Hassalstrongylus dollfusi males are: the morphology of the caudal bursa and the peculiar shape of the distal tip of the spicules. Characters of the female are: the dorsal cuticular inflation at ovejector level and the subventral postvulvar alae supported by hypertrophied struts.

== Biology and distribution ==
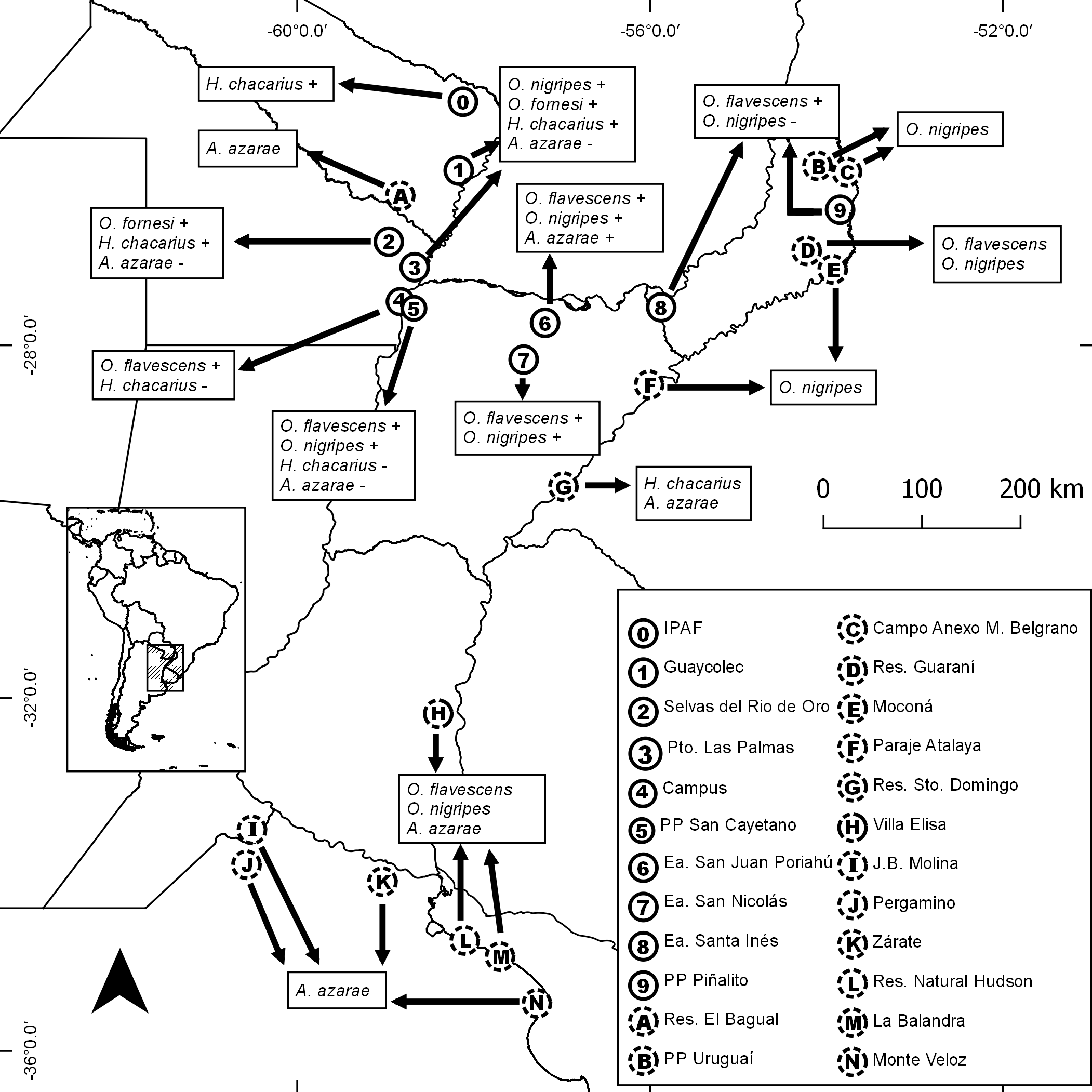
A map of the distribution of Hassalstrongylus dollfusi in Argentina

The species is parasitic in the small intestine of rodents. Hassalstrongylus dollfusi was first described in 1963 as a parasite of a wild house mouse, Mus musculus, in Venezuela and was never reported again for the next six decades. In 2021 a paper based on a large survey of native rodents showed that the species was actually present as a parasite in five species of wild native cricetid rodents in Argentina: Oligoryzomys fornesi, Oligoryzomys flavescens, Oligoryzomys nigripes, Holochilus chacarius and Akodon azarae. The authors wrote that Hassalstrongylus dollfusi showed a strong preference for host species of Oligoryzomys, which appear to act as primary hosts.
