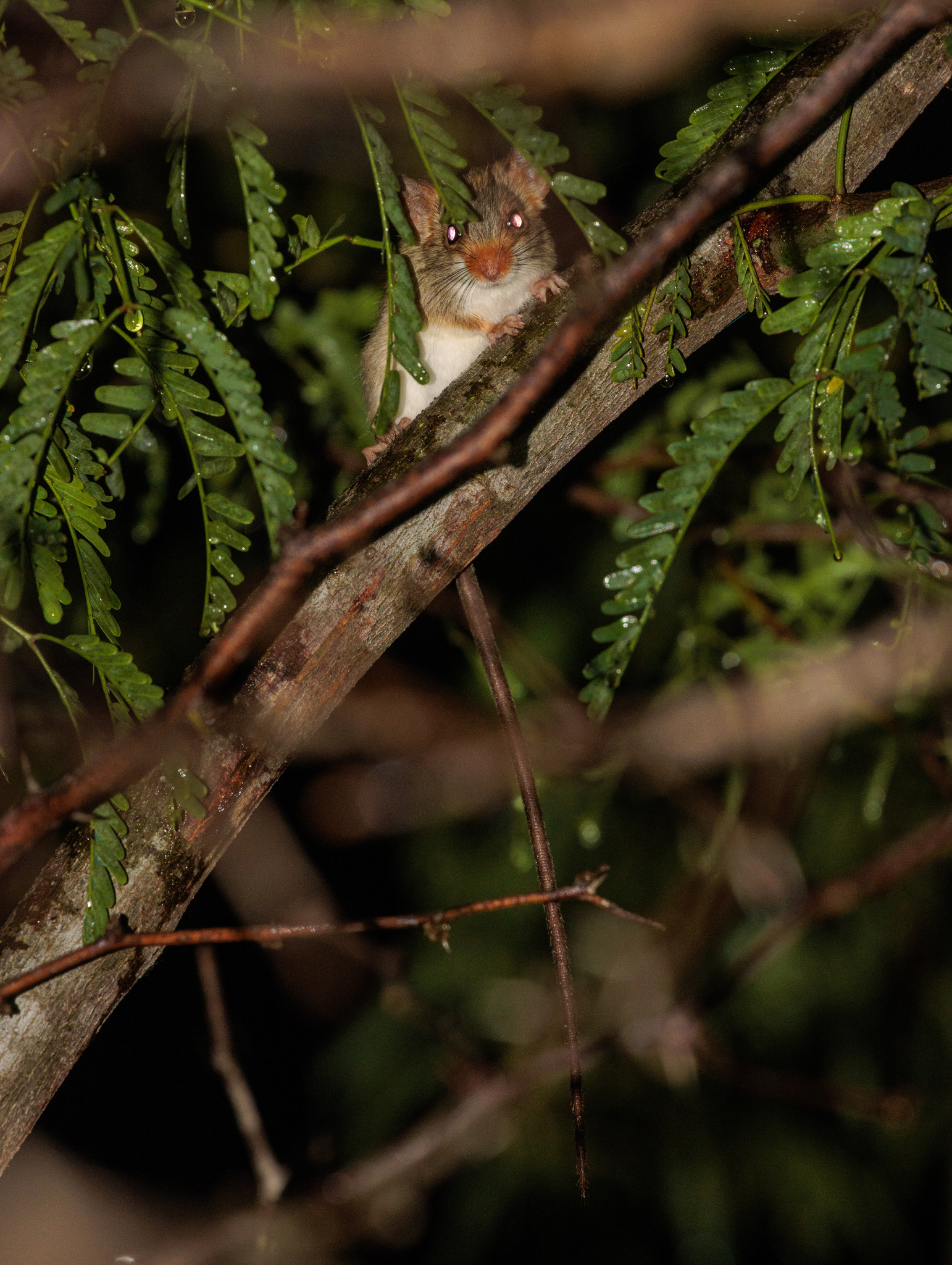
- Wiedomys cerradensis

Scientific classification
- Domain: Eukaryota
- Kingdom: Animalia
- Phylum: Chordata
- Class: Mammalia
- Order: Rodentia
- Family: Cricetidae
- Subfamily: Sigmodontinae
- Tribe: Wiedomyini
- Genus: Wiedomys; Hershkovitz, 1959

Type species
- Mus pyrrhorhinos

Species
- Wiedomys cerradensis Wiedomys pyrrhorhinos

= Wiedomys =

Wiedomys Temporal range: Pleistocene - Recent

Genus of rodents

Wiedomys is a genus of South American rodents in the family Cricetidae.

== Species ==
- Cerrado red-nosed mouse (Wiedomys cerradensis)
- Red-nosed mouse (Wiedomys pyrrhorhinos)
