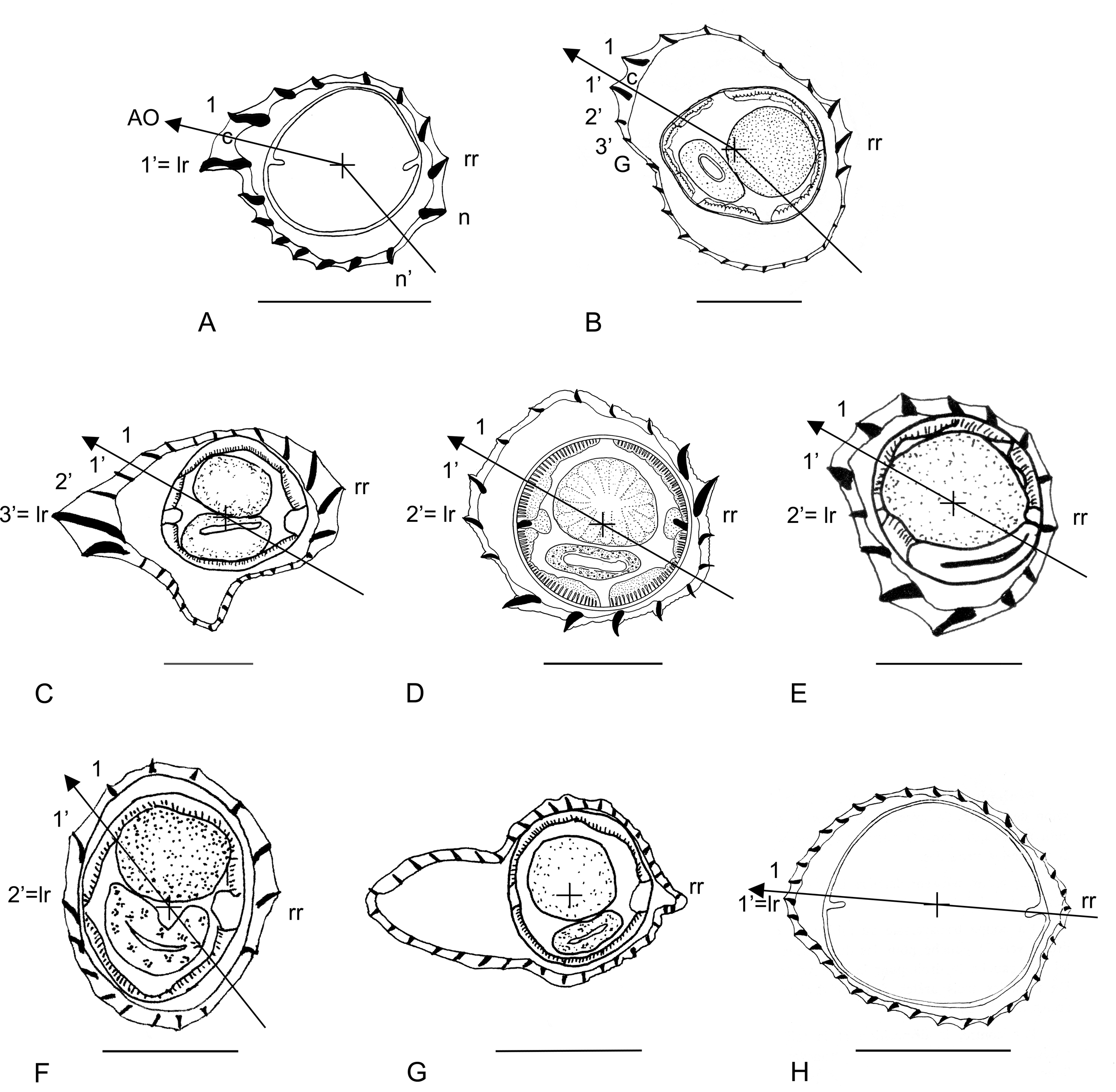
- Synlophes of species of Odilia

Scientific classification
- Kingdom: Animalia
- Phylum: Nematoda
- Class: Chromadorea
- Order: Rhabditida
- Family: Heligmonellidae
- Genus: Odilia; Durette-Desset, 1973

Type species
- Odilia mackerrasae (Mawson, 1961)

Species
- See text

= Odilia (nematode) =

Genus of roundworms

Odilia is a genus of nematode worms established by Marie-Claude Durette-Desset in 1973 that infect mostly murid rodents of the Australasian region (species of Melomys, Rattus and Uromys from mainland Australia and Tasmania.

Species include:

- Odilia brachybursa (Mawson, 1961) (Host: Melomys, Australia)
- Odilia emanuelae (Mawson, 1961) (Host: Rattus, Australia)
- Odilia mackerrasae (Mawson, 1961) (Host: Melomys, Uromys, Australia) – type species
- Odilia melomyos (Mawson, 1961) (Host: Melomys, Uromys, Australia)
- Odilia tasmaniensis Gibbons & Spratt, 1995 (Host: Rattus, Tasmania)
