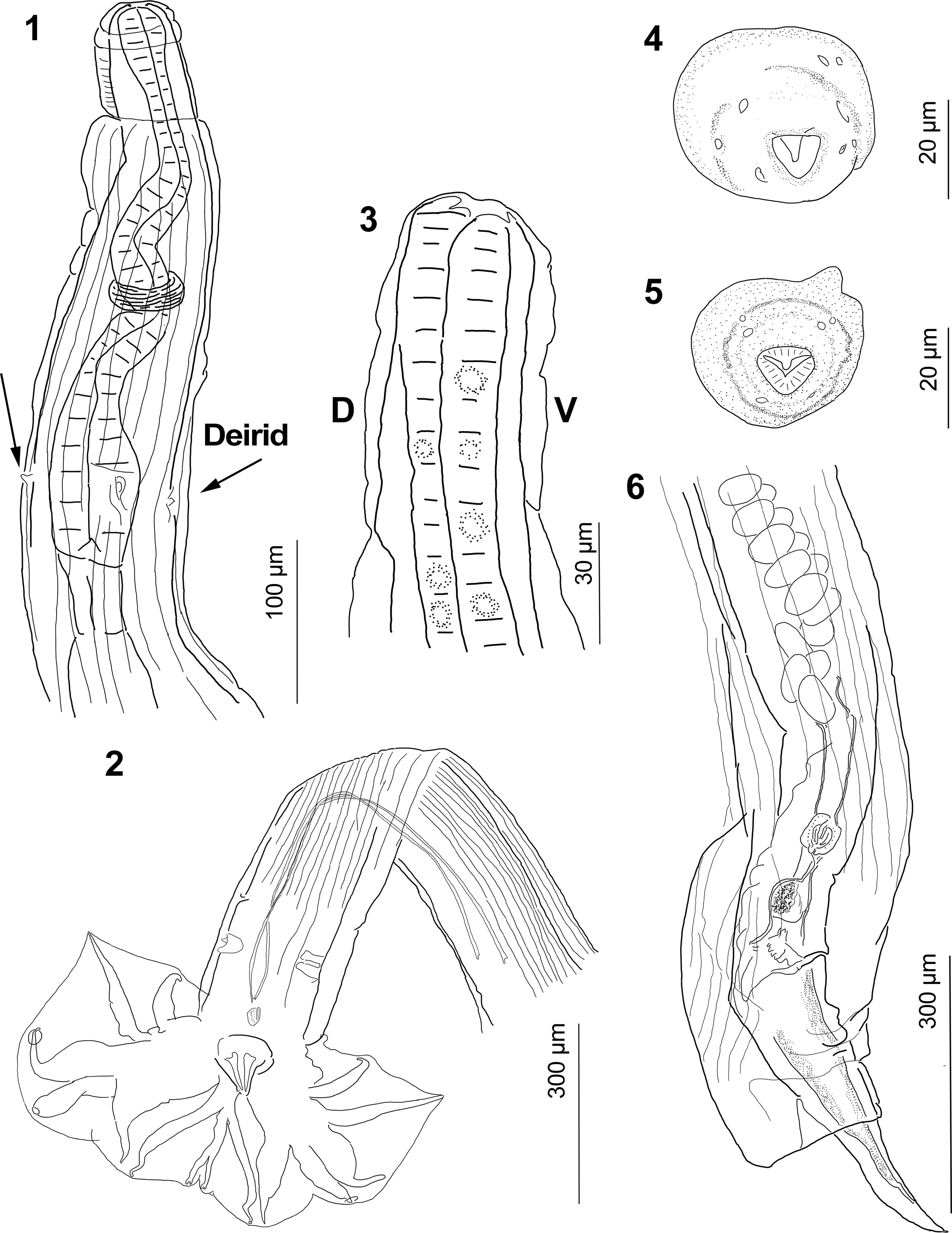
- Guerrerostrongylus marginalis

Scientific classification
- Kingdom: Animalia
- Phylum: Nematoda
- Class: Chromadorea
- Order: Rhabditida
- Family: Heligmonellidae
- Genus: Guerrerostrongylus; Sutton & Durette-Desset, 1991

Type species
- Guerrerostrongylus uruguayensis Sutton and Durette-Desset, 1991

Species
- See text.

= Guerrerostrongylus =

Genus of roundworms

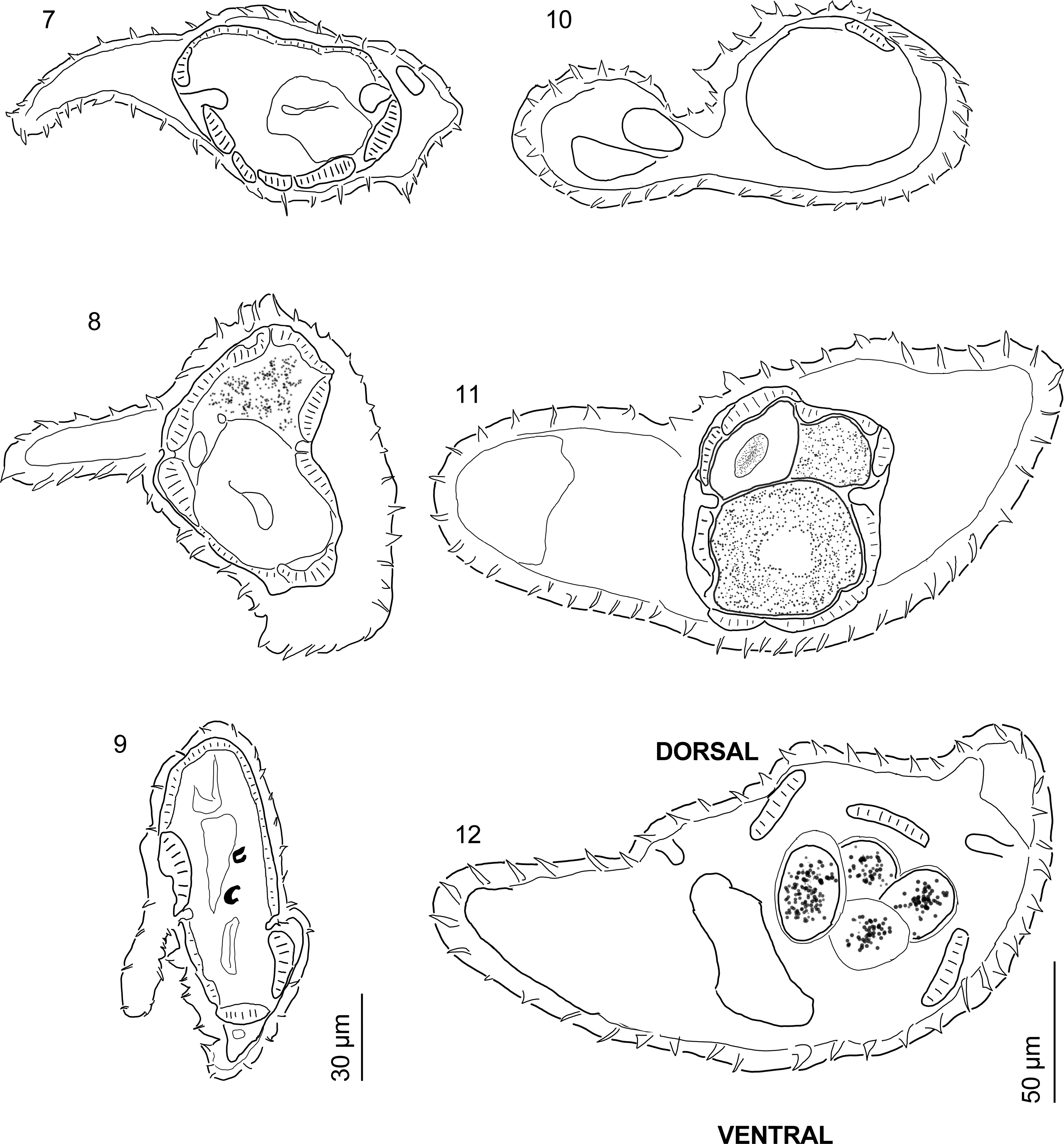
Synlophe of Guerrerostrongylus marginalis (transverse sections)

Guerrerostrongylus is a genus of nematode worms. Species of Guerrerostrongylus infect mostly the digestive tract of sigmodontine and caviomorph rodents from South America. The genus is part of the subfamily Nippostrongylinae.

Species include:

- Guerrerostrongylus uruguayensis Sutton and Durette-Desset, 1991 (type-species)
- Guerrerostrongylus zetta (Travassos, 1937)
- Guerrerostrongylus gomesae Simões, dos Santos and Maldonado, 2012
- Guerrerostrongylus ulysi Digiani, Notarnicola, and Navone, 2012
- Guerrerostrongylus marginalis Weirich, Catzeflis, and Jiménez, 2016
