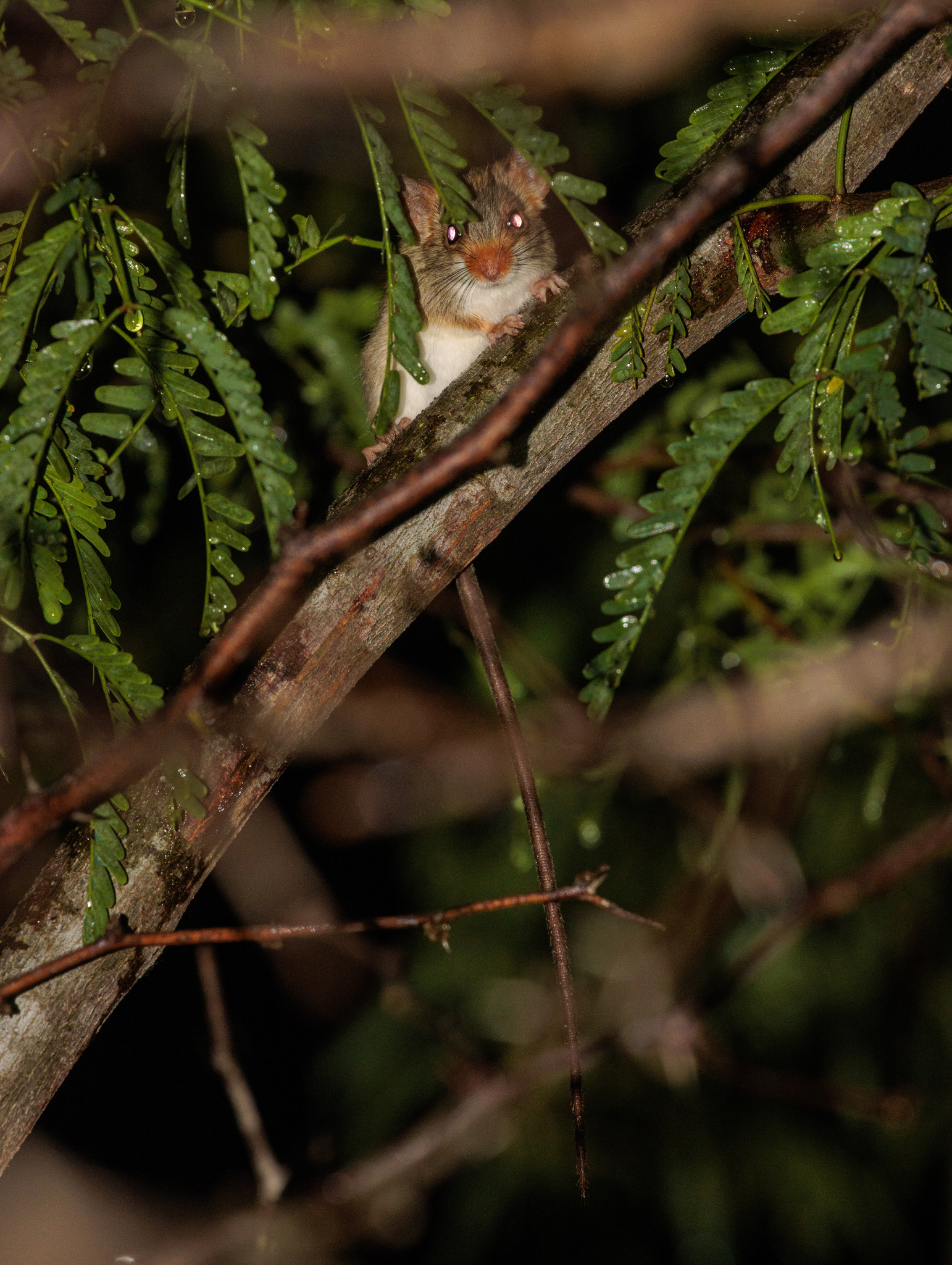
- Photo of Cerrado Red-nosed Mouse (Wiedomys)

Conservation status
- Data Deficient (IUCN 3.1)

Scientific classification
- Kingdom: Animalia
- Phylum: Chordata
- Class: Mammalia
- Order: Rodentia
- Family: Cricetidae
- Subfamily: Sigmodontinae
- Genus: Wiedomys
- Species: W. cerradensis

Binomial name
- Wiedomys cerradensis Gonçalves, Almeida & Bonvicino, 2005

= Cerrado red-nosed mouse =

Species of rodent

The cerrado red-nosed mouse (Wiedomys cerradensis) is a rodent species from South America. It is known from one locality in Bahia, eastern Brazil. The species was found in semi-deciduous forest in the cerrado ecoregion.
