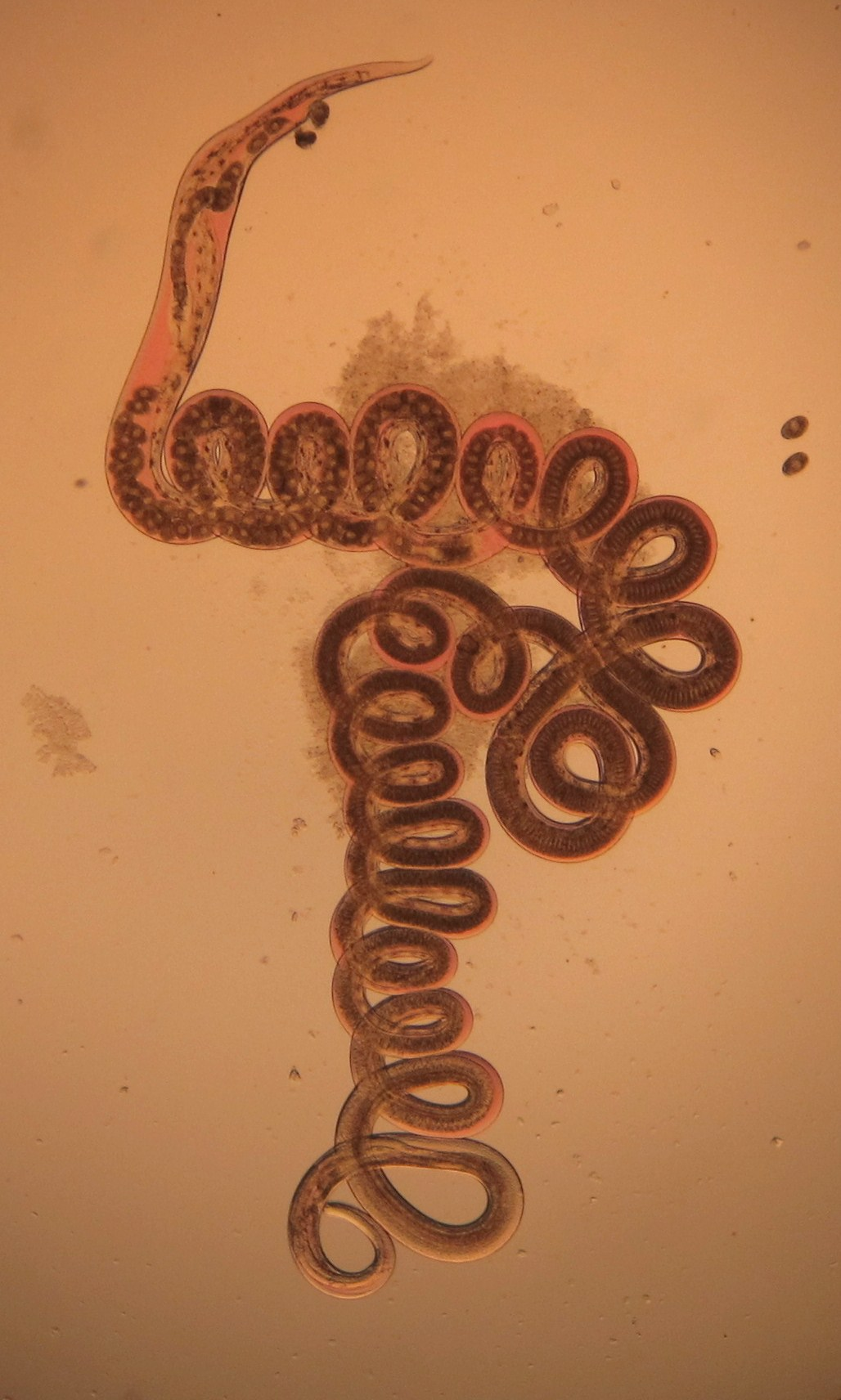
- The nematode under optical microscope

Scientific classification
- Domain: Eukaryota
- Kingdom: Animalia
- Phylum: Nematoda
- Class: Chromadorea
- Order: Rhabditida
- Family: Heligmosomidae
- Genus: Heligmosomoides; Hall, 1916

= Heligmosomoides =

Genus of roundworms

Heligmosomoides is a genus of nematodes belonging to the family Heligmosomidae.

The species of this genus are found in Europe and Northern America.

Species:

- Heligmosomoides aberrans (Roe, 1929)
- Heligmosomoides americanus Durette-Desset, Kinsella & Forester, 1972
- Heligmosomoides asakawae Tenora & Barus, 2001
- Heligmosomoides azerbaidjani (Schachnasarova, 1949)
- Heligmosomoides bakeri Durette-Desset, Kinsella & Forester, 1972
- Heligmosomoides borealis Schulz, 1930
- Heligmosomoides corsicus Durette-Desset, 1968
- Heligmosomoides desportesi Chabaud, Rausch & Desset, 1963
- Heligmosomoides dubius (Baylis, 1926)
- Heligmosomoides glareoli Baylis, 1928
- Heligmosomoides glomerophilus Tschertkowa & Tarjymanova, 1973
- Heligmosomoides hudsoni Cameron, 1937
- Heligmosomoides juvenus Kirschenblatt, 1949
- Heligmosomoides kratochvili Tenora & Barus, 1955
- Heligmosomoides kurilensis Nadtochi, 1966
- Heligmosomoides laevis Dujardin, 1845
- Heligmosomoides longicirratum Schulz, 1954
- Heligmosomoides longispiculum (Tokobajev & Erkulov, 1966)
- Heligmosomoides neopolygyrus Asakawa & Ohbayashi, 1986
- Heligmosomoides orientalis Jun, 1979
- Heligmosomoides polygyrus Dujardin, 1845
- Heligmosomoides protobullosus Asakawa & Ohbayashi, 1987
- Heligmosomoides ryjikovi
- Heligmosomoides skrjabini Schulz, 1926
- Heligmosomoides smirnovae Durette-Desset, Rausch & Kayemba, 1980
- Heligmosomoides speciosus
- Heligmosomoides thomomyos Gardner & Jasmer, 1983
- Heligmosomoides travassosi Schulz, 1926
- Heligmosomoides turgidus Walton, 1923
- Heligmosomoides ussuriensis Lubimov, 1932
- Heligmosomoides wisconsinensis Durette-Desset, 1967
- Heligmosomoides yorkei Schulz, 1926
