= Heligmosomidae =

Scientific classification
- Kingdom: Animalia
- Phylum: Nematoda
- Class: Chromadorea
- Order: Rhabditida
- Family: Heligmosomidae

Synonyms
- Heligosomatidae; Heligmosomatidae

Family of roundworms

Heligmosomidae is a family of nematodes belonging to the order Rhabditida.

== Genera ==
Genera:

- Citellinema Hall, 1916
- Citellinoides Dikmans, 1939
- Dessetia Genov & Janchev, 1981
- Heligmosomoides
- Nippostrongylus Lane, 1923
