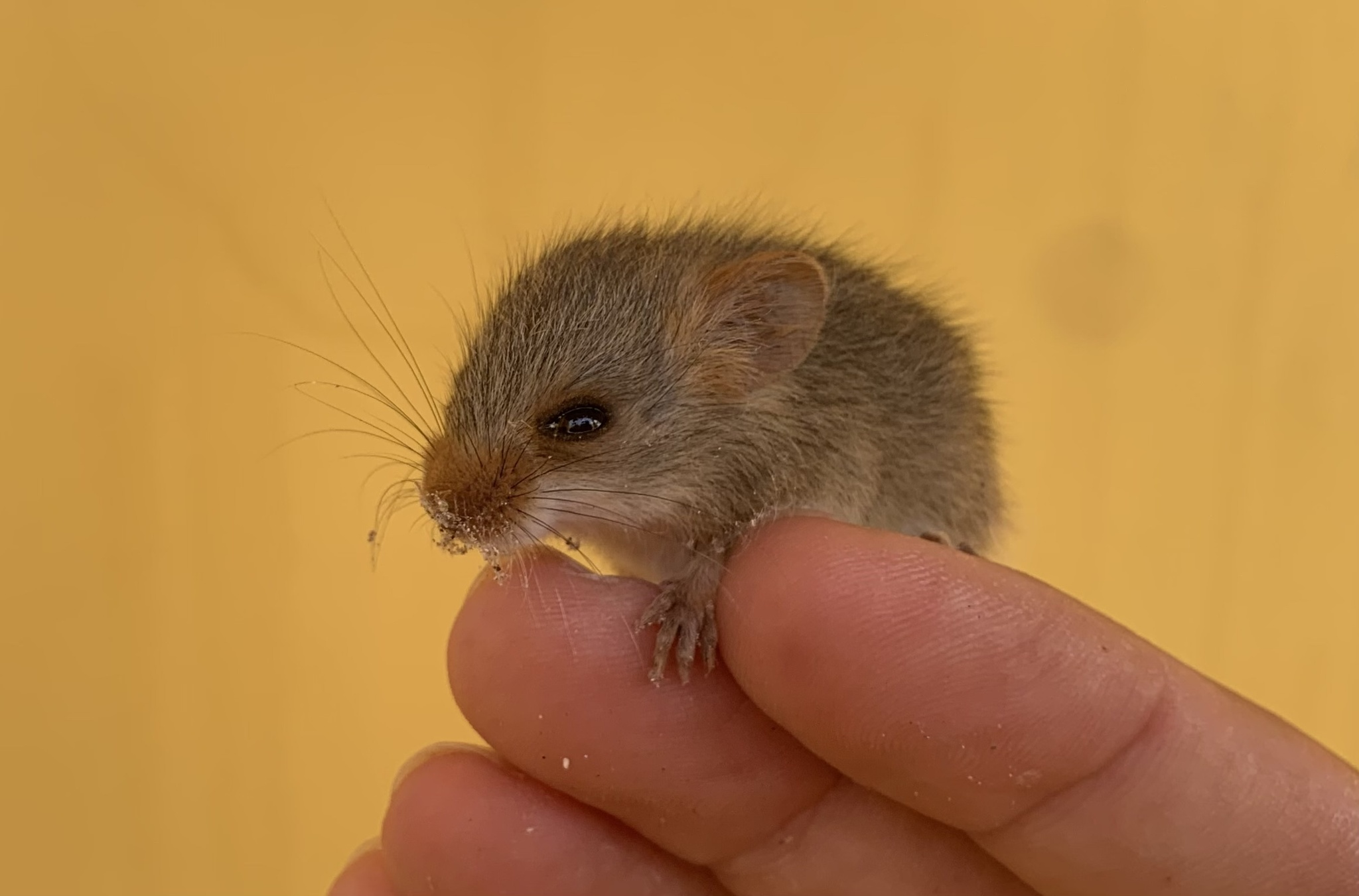

Conservation status
- Least Concern (IUCN 3.1)

Scientific classification
- Kingdom: Animalia
- Phylum: Chordata
- Class: Mammalia
- Order: Rodentia
- Family: Cricetidae
- Subfamily: Sigmodontinae
- Genus: Wiedomys
- Species: W. pyrrhorhinos

Binomial name
- Wiedomys pyrrhorhinos (Wied-Neuwied, 1821)

= Red-nosed mouse =

Species of rodent

The red-nosed mouse (Wiedomys pyrrhorhinos) is a semi-arboreal rodent species in the family Cricetidae which is endemic to eastern Brazil. It is also locally known as rato-de-nariz-vermelho da Caatinga (Caatinga red-nosed mouse), rato-da-fava (fava mouse), rato-bico-de-lacre (waxbill mouse), rato-de-palmatória (paddle mouse), and rato-do-algodão (cotton mouse).

== Taxonomy ==
The holotype specimen of the red-nosed mouse was collected in the state of Bahia along the Ribeirão da Ressaca, a tributary of the Rio Gavião, by German explorer and naturalist Prince Alexander Philipp Maximilian of Wied-Neuweid. Wied-Neuweid described and named this specimen as Mus pyrrhorinos in 1821. Since it was originally described, the red-nosed mouse has been at times classified as a member of Oryzomys or Thomasomys until it was placed by American mammalologist Philip Hershkovitz as the type species for the newly-created genus Wiedomys in 1959.

The scientific epithet has historically been spelled as pyrrhorinos, pyrrhorhinos, and pyrrorhinus in various different taxonomic publications, and there has been some debate over which variation takes priority. As of 2023, pyrrhorhinos has been established as taking priority, as it was the first published version (having been published in October of 1821).

== Description ==
The red-nosed mouse is a relatively large mouse, with a head-and-body length of 80 - 205 mm and weighing 37 - 45 grams. It has a soft, dense, grizzled-brown coat, with grayish coloration on its flanks and white on its belly and the forelimbs and hindlimbs. Most notably, the rump, eye-ring, ears, muzzle, hands, and feet are covered with bright orange hairs. The tail is dark brown, with the underside being slightly paler.

== Distribution ==
It is found from Minais Gerais state through Bahia and Sergipe, having a wide range within the Caatinga and Cerrado ecoregions. It is known primarily from the Caatinga, where it has a broad distribution that includes the driest areas of the region, but is also known from the tropical savanna habitat of the Cerrado and the coastal moist broadleaf forests of the Atlantic Forests ecoregion. Although some sources report it as being rare, others report it as being common or locally abundant.

== Habitat and Ecology ==
The red-nosed mouse is omnivorous, feeding on grains, leaves, and insects, and inhabits dry deciduous and scrub forests, tropical savanna, and mesophytic forests. Although it is not a true specialist of arid habitats, the red-nosed mouse does exhibit several morphological features commonly found in desert rodents such as a long tail, large eyes, and large auditory bullae. Notably, it also demonstrates the highest urine concentration capability among Brazilian Sigmodontidae.

It is an agile climber, being described varyingly as semi-arboreal or scansorial, and it is primarily nocturnal and crepuscular, although diurnal activity in nesting sites has been reported. The red-nosed mouse nests in trees or shrubs, with specimens having been collected from nests located in hedges of Euphorbia tirucalli, a non-native species commonly cultivated as an ornamental plant. It is also known to use abandoned bird nests for shelter and as nesting sites. Wied-Neuwied recorded having found red-nosed mice inhabiting one of the chambers of a rufous-fronted thornbird (Phallocedomus rufifrons) nest. It has also been observed using abandoned ovoid bird nests constructed on xique-xique cacti (Xiquexique gounellei), and termite nests previously inhabited by parrots.

Although the life history of the red-nosed mouse is poorly understood, population sizes of the red-nosed mouse are known to undergo significant fluctuations. Populations can dramatically increase, sometimes leading to population outbreaks, in years with consistently above-average rainfall. Red-nosed mice may breed continuously throughout the year, and appear to be capable of reproducing during periods of prolonged water stress and drought. Pregnant females have been collected most frequently during the mid to late wet season, when offspring would have access to plentiful food resources, and there appears to be a strong correlation between the percentage of pregnant females collected and rainfall amounts over the past one to two months. However, pregnant females are still found during the unfavorable dry season, and males with vascularized testes are found throughout the year, with no known seasonal variations. Litter sizes can be as small as 2 or as large as 11, with the mean being 5 - 6.

Larva of ticks in genus Ornithodoros or Alectorobius have been found parasitizing red-nosed mice in the Caatinga. One study found that a captured wild red-nosed mouse in the Caatinga was seroreactive to Coxiella burnetii, the causative agent of Q fever, suggesting that it may play a role in local enzootic cycles of C. burnetii infections and could contribute to risks of human infections.

== Status ==
It is listed as being Least Concern on the IUCN Red List due to having a presumably large population across a wide distribution and tolerance for a broad range of habitats and environmental conditions. Although habitat destruction is occurring throughout its range, it does not represent a major threat to the red-nosed mouse's survival, and the species is described as being locally abundant. It does occur in several protected areas.
