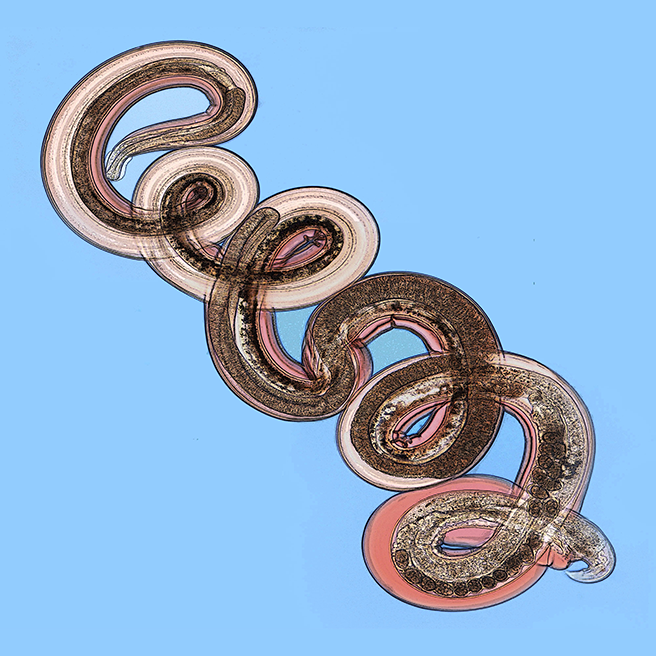

Scientific classification
- Domain: Eukaryota
- Kingdom: Animalia
- Phylum: Nematoda
- Class: Chromadorea
- Order: Rhabditida
- Family: Heligmonellidae
- Subfamily: Nippostrongylinae
- Genus: Nippostrongylus; Lane, 1923

= Nippostrongylus =

Genus of roundworms

Nippostrongylus is a genus of nematodes belonging to the family Heligmonellidae.

The genus has almost cosmopolitan distribution.

Species:

- Nippostrongylus brasiliensis (Travassos, 1914)
- Nippostrongylus smalesae Asakawa, 2017
