= Cursor grass mouse =

Cursor Grass Mouse

Conservation status
- Least Concern (IUCN 3.1)

Scientific classification
- Kingdom: Animalia
- Phylum: Chordata
- Class: Mammalia
- Order: Rodentia
- Family: Cricetidae
- Subfamily: Sigmodontinae
- Genus: Akodon
- Species: A. cursor

Binomial name
- Akodon cursor Winge, 1888

Species of rodent

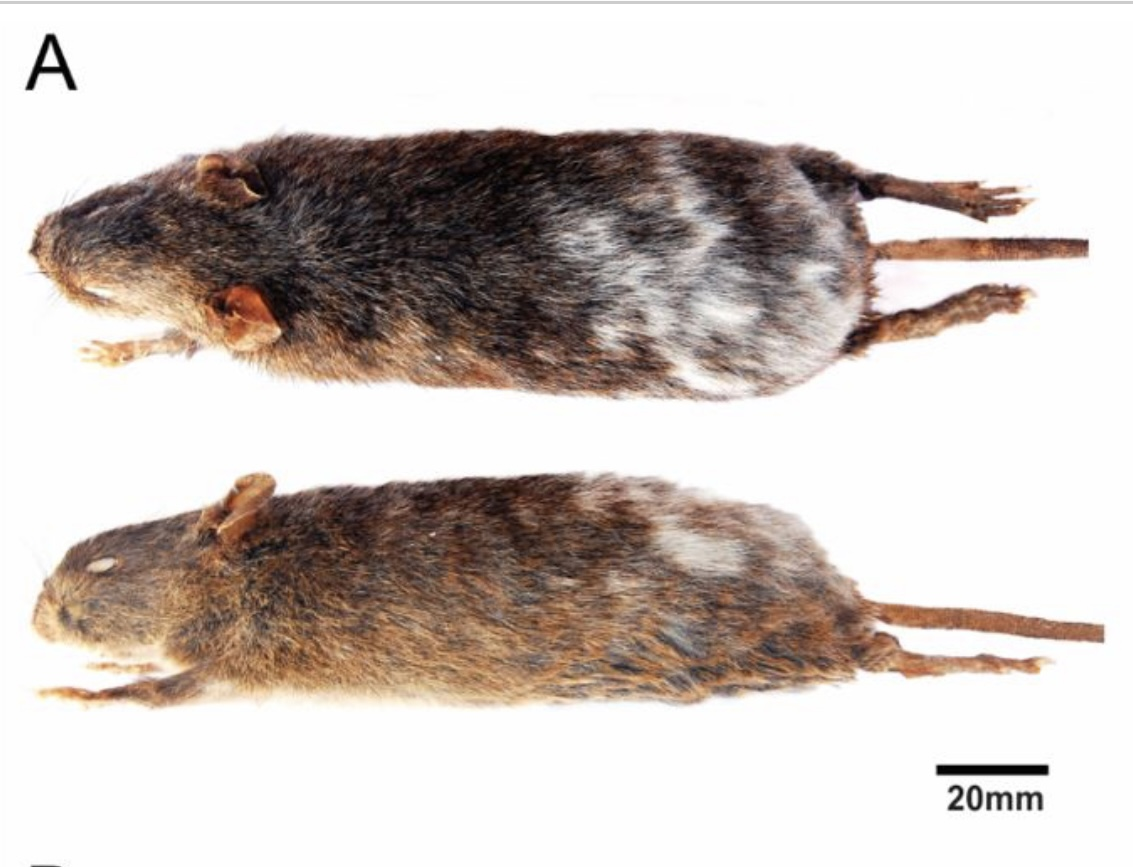

The cursor grass mouse, or cursorial akodont (Akodon cursor), is a sigmodontine rodent from South America.

== Description ==
The cursor grass mouse is a moderately sized rodent, with a head-body length of 11 to 13 centimetres (4.3 to 5.1 in), and a tail 8 to 11 centimetres (3.1 to 4.3 in) long. Males are larger than females, weighing an average of 54 grams (1.9 oz), compared with 43 g (1.5 oz) for females. They have a typical mouse-like appearance, with short whiskers and stubby claws on the feet. They have dark to golden brown fur over most of their body, with paler greyish or yellowish underparts. Some have a whitish spot between the ears, but this is not present on all individuals.

Cursor grass mice are members of the A. cursor species group, and very similar in appearance to other members of the group. In particular, they cannot easily be distinguished from the closely related montane grass mouse, which inhabits neighbouring regions to the immediate south. Although the cursor grass mouse is, on average, slightly larger than the montane species, there is too much overlap for this to be a reliable guide. Instead, they can most readily be distinguished by the presence of a gall bladder in A. cursor (absent in the montane species), by karyotypic analysis, or by means of PCR based techniques.

== Distribution and habitat ==
The exact geographic range of the cursor grass mouse is disputed. It is definitively known to inhabit eastern Brazil from Paraíba to Paraná, where it lives in patches of tropical Atlantic Forest and restinga scrubland at elevations from sea level to 1,170 metres (3,840 ft). Some sources also report it as being found further south, in extreme southern Brazil, in eastern Paraguay, and in northern Argentina. These latter sources lack a definitive genetic analysis of the individuals identified, and it has been argued that they may represent members of other species, such as the montane grass mouse. No subspecies are recognised.

== Biology and behaviour ==
Cursor grass mice are omnivorous. Their primary diet consists of small arthropods, especially Hymenoptera, beetles, and spiders; this is supplemented by seeds of Cecropia and other plants. They search for food through leaf litter and patches of dense vegetation, and are strictly terrestrial. Individuals have a home range of 0.1 to 0.7 hectares (0.25 to 1.73 acres), with the ranges of males being larger than those of females. Although the size of their home ranges does not change, the population density of cursor grass mice becomes significantly higher during the rainy season, when insects are most abundant.

Cursor grass mice breed throughout the year, although most births occur during the dry season between June and September. Pregnant females construct globular nests, and give birth to a litter of two to nine young, with an average of four, after a gestation period of 23 days.

This species is particularly important for public health since it has been implied as a Hantavirus reservoir.

A cell line derived from a liposarcoma in a cursor grass mouse has been used by biomedical scientists in the construction of a panel for the identification of human chromosomes in hybrid cells.
