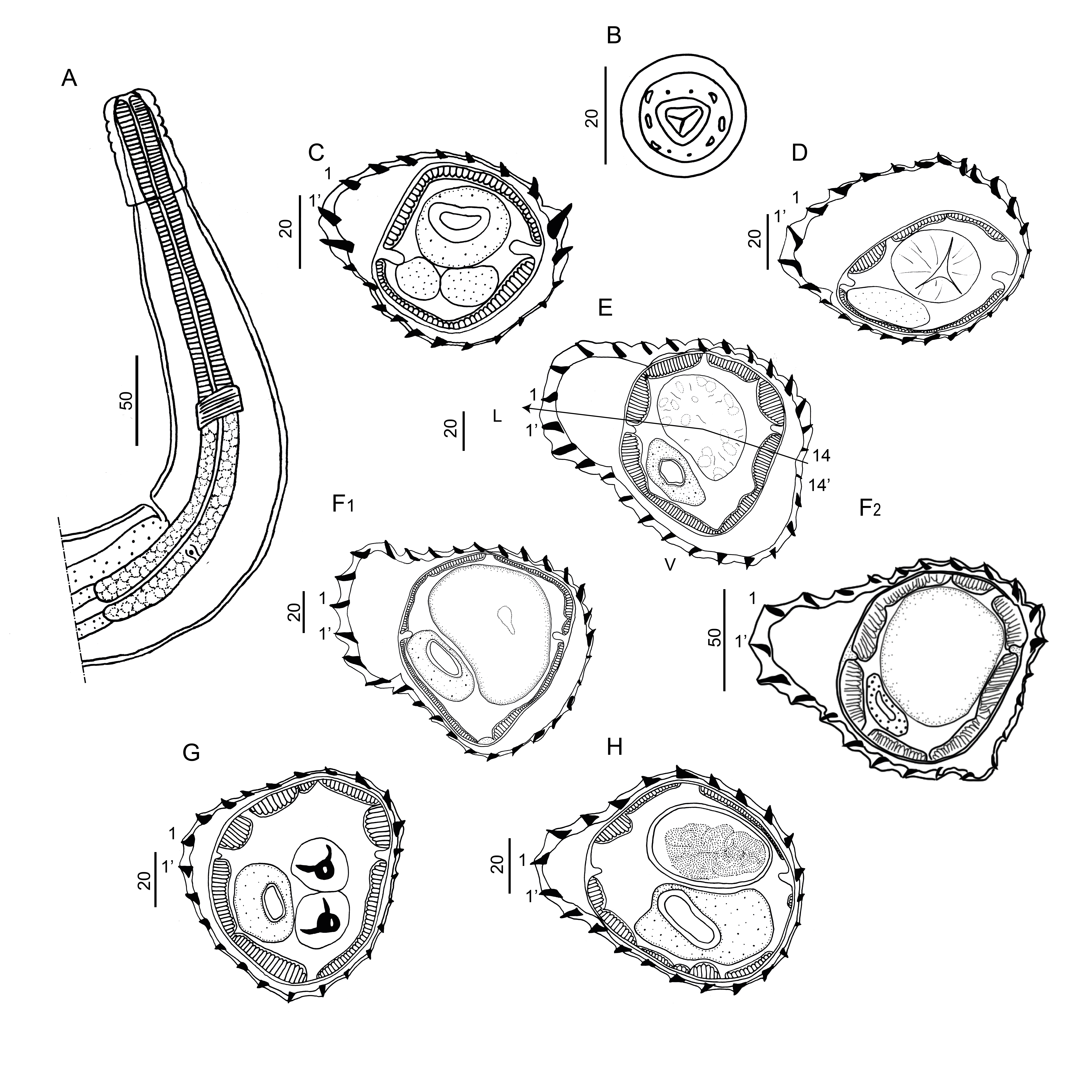
- Hassalstrongylus dollfusi

Scientific classification
- Kingdom: Animalia
- Phylum: Nematoda
- Class: Chromadorea
- Order: Rhabditida
- Superfamily: Trichostrongyloidea
- Family: Heligmonellidae

= Heligmonellidae =

Family of roundworms

Heligmonellidae is a family of nematodes belonging to the order Rhabditida.

== Genera ==
A few genera:

- Acanthostrongylus Travassos, 1937
- Alippistrongylus Digiani & Kinsella, 2014
- Brevistriata Travassos, 1937
- Guerrerostrongylus Sutton and Durette-Desset, 1991
- Hassalstrongylus Durette-Desset, 1971
- Nippostrongylus Lane, 1923
- Odilia Durette-Desset, 1973
