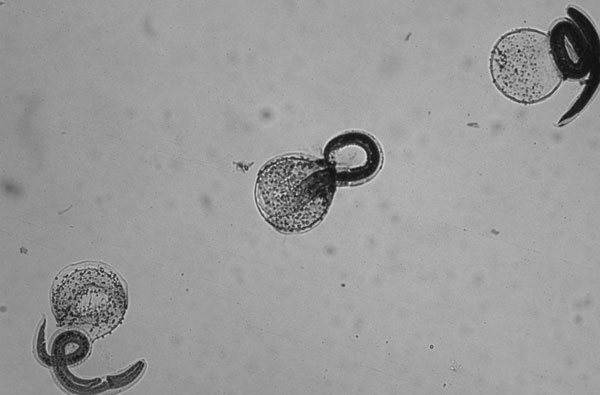
- Freshly hatched B. procyonis larvae

Scientific classification
- Kingdom: Animalia
- Phylum: Nematoda
- Class: Chromadorea
- Order: Rhabditida
- Family: Ascarididae
- Genus: Baylisascaris
- Species: B. procyonis

Binomial name
- Baylisascaris procyonis (Stefanski & Zarnowski, 1951)

Synonyms
- Ascaris procyonis Stefanski & Zarnowski, 1951

= Baylisascaris procyonis =

Species of roundworm

Baylisascaris procyonis, also known by the common name raccoon roundworm, is a nematode, found ubiquitously in raccoons, the definitive hosts. It is named after H. A. Baylis, who studied them in the 1920s–30s, and Greek askaris (intestinal worm). Baylisascaris larvae in paratenic hosts can migrate, causing larva migrans. Baylisascariasis as the zoonotic infection of humans is rare, though extremely dangerous due to the ability of the parasite's larvae to migrate into brain tissue and cause damage. Concern for human infection has been increasing over the years due to the urbanization of rural areas, resulting in the increase in proximity and potential human interaction with raccoons.

== Signs and symptoms ==
The potential for human infection was noted in 1969 by Paul C. Beaver, who studied infected mice, and the first case was reported 15 years later. Human infection with B. procyonis has been relatively rare, with 37 cases reported since 1980. However, disease caused by this parasite can be extremely dangerous, causing death or severe symptoms. Reported disease has primarily afflicted children and almost all cases were a result of the ingestion of contaminated soil or feces (pica). Even with treatment, prognosis is poor and patients in nearly all cases experience permanent neurological damage. Serious complications include prolonged migration and persistence of helminth larvae in the viscera (visceral larva migrans), the brain (neural larva migrans), and the eye (ocular larva migrans). It is possible that human infection is more common than diagnosed and most cases do not reach a clinical stage. Antibodies to B. procyonis have been found in otherwise healthy individuals, suggesting subclinical infections.

== Cause ==
=== Transmission ===
In North America, B. procyonis infection rates in raccoons are very high, being found in around 70% of adult raccoons and 90% of juvenile raccoons. Transmission occurs similarly to other roundworm species, through the fecal-oral route. Eggs are produced by the worm while in the intestine, and the released eggs will mature to an infective state externally in the soil. When an infected egg is ingested, the larvae will hatch and enter the intestine. Transmission of B. procyonis may also occur through the ingestion of larvae found in infected tissue.

=== Life cycle ===
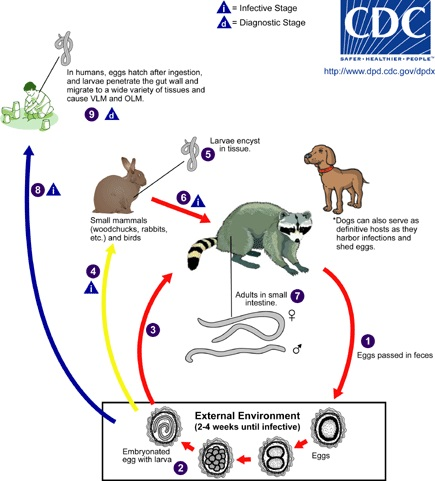
The life cycle of B. procyonis.

An adult worm lives and reproduces in the intestine of its definitive host, the raccoon. The female worm can produce between 115,000–179,000 eggs per day. Eggs are excreted along with feces, and become infective in the soil after 2–4 weeks. If ingested by another raccoon, the life cycle repeats. However, if these eggs are ingested by an intermediate host (small mammals, birds) the larvae of B. procyonis will penetrate the gut wall of the host and migrate into tissues. Larvae tend to migrate to the brain, cause damage, and affect the behaviour of the intermediate host, making it an easier prey for raccoons. Reproduction does not occur in these intermediate hosts; however, if a raccoon preys on an infected paratenic host, the encysted larvae can become adults in the raccoon and the cycle resumes.

== Diagnosis ==
Diagnosis is often clinical, based on neurologic deterioriation (meningoencephalitis) in children or persons with developmental disabilities with a history of pica, and findings of peripheral or cerebrospinal fluid eosinophilia and ring-enhancing lesions or other abnormalities on brain imaging. Uncommonly, a live nematode can be detected on retinal examination (ocular larva migrans).

Laboratory and clinical diagnosis can be challenging: there is no commercially available serologic test in the United States, and although identification of larvae in tissue or specimens is confirmatory, this is not always possible or practical.

Diagnosis of B. procyonis is through identification of larvae in tissue examination. Diagnosis requires forehand knowledge along with understanding and recognition of larval morphologic characteristics, including ability to distinguish between a number of possible other parasites, including Toxocara canis, Toxocara cati, Ascaris lumbricoides, and among species of Gnathostoma, Angiostrongylus, and Ancylostoma. Distinguishing features of B. procyonis larvae in tissue are its relatively large size (60 μ) and prominent single lateral alae. Sometimes serologic testing is used as supportive evidence, although no commercial serologic test is currently available. Other diagnosis methods include: brain biopsy, neuroimaging, electroencephalography, differential diagnoses among other laboratory tests.

Human Baylisascariasis is under-recognized, as the knowledge of the clinical illness is still incomplete. This could be because of the difficulty of diagnosing the illness. As small numbers of larvae can cause severe disease, and larvae occur randomly in tissue, a biopsy usually fails to include larvae and therefore leads to negative results. The identification of the morphologic characteristics takes practice and experience and may not be accurately recognized or could be misidentified. The fact that no commercial serologic test exists for the diagnosis of B. procyonis infection makes the diagnosis and treatment more difficult.

== Treatment ==
Aggressive and early treatment with corticosteroids and albendazole can result in complete recovery.

== Prevention ==
Educating the public about the dangers of contact with raccoons or their feces is the most important preventive step.
Parents should encourage their children to practice good hygiene; Hand-washing after outdoor play or contact with animals is very important. Fences can be used to prevent raccoons from visiting homes, garbage, or yards for food. Keeping raccoons as pets is strongly discouraged. Raccoon latrines in and around homes should be checked for and cleaned as soon as possible. Thermal disinfection methods like boiling water, steam-cleaning, or incineration are highly effective and are easily accessible means to decontaminate household things or areas. Disinfectants like sodium hypochlorite wash away the eggs but do not kill them.

== Epidemiology ==
Baylisascaris procyonis is found abundantly in its definitive host, the raccoon. The parasite has been found to have the ability to infect more than 90 kinds of wild and domestic animals. Many of these animals act as paratenic hosts and the infection results in the penetration of the gut wall by the larvae and subsequent invasion of tissue, resulting in severe disease. In animals, it is the most common cause of larva migrans. The paratenic host, however, cannot shed infective eggs, as the larva will not complete its life cycle until it makes its way into a raccoon. Raccoons are solitary but will frequently defecate in communal areas known as raccoon latrines. These latrines are an abundant source of B. procyonis eggs, which can remain viable for years. Raccoons therefore are important in maintaining the parasite, providing a source of infection for humans and other animals.

The white-footed mouse (Peromyscus leucopus) among other small rodents are considered common intermediate hosts. Migration patterns of rodents can explain the spread of Baylisascaris to multiple locations and the subsequent infection of humans who may come into contact with eggs shed by infected raccoons. The mice may be infected as a result of contact with raccoon latrines. Foraging upon food contaminated with traces of raccoon feces can also lead to exposure to B. procyonis eggs. Rodents are easily found in many areas with human population which increases the risk of transmission. The increase in the raccoon population (and inevitably B. procyonis) has become a major factor for the number of extirpations the Allegheny woodrat (Neotoma magister) has suffered in recent decades.

== See also ==
- List of parasites (human)
