= List of parasites of humans =

Number of reported guinea worm dracunculiasis cases

== Endoparasites ==
=== Protozoan organisms ===
Common name of organism or disease	Latin name (sorted)	Body parts affected	Diagnostic specimen	Prevalence	Source/Transmission (Reservoir/Vector)
Granulomatous amoebic encephalitis and Acanthamoeba keratitis (eye infection)	Acanthamoeba spp.	eye, brain, skin	culture or PCR	worldwide	contact lenses cleaned with contaminated tap water
Granulomatous amoebic encephalitis	Balamuthia mandrillaris	brain, skin	culture or metagenomic sequencing	worldwide	via inhalation or skin lesion
Babesiosis	Babesia B. divergens, B. bigemina, B. equi, B. microfti, B. duncani	red blood cells	Giemsa-stained thin blood smear	New England (different species have worldwide distribution)	tick bites, e.g. Ixodes scapularis
Balantidiasis	Balantidium coli	intestinal mucosa, may become invasive in some patients	stool (diarrhea=ciliated trophozoite; solid stool=large cyst with horseshoe shaped nucleus)		ingestion of cyst, zoonotic infection acquired from pigs via fecal contamination.
Blastocystosis	Blastocystis spp.	intestinal	direct microscopy of stool sample or fecal PCR	• worldwide: one of the most common human parasites • Developing regions: infects 40–100% of the total populations	eating food contaminated with feces from an infected human or animal
Cryptosporidiosis	Cryptosporidium spp.	intestines	stool	Widespread	ingestion of oocyst (sporulated), some species are zoonotic (e.g. bovine fecal contamination)
Cyclosporiasis	Cyclospora cayetanensis	intestines	stool	United States	ingestion of oocyst through contaminated food
Dientamoebiasis	Dientamoeba fragilis	intestines	stool	up to 10% in industrialized countries	ingesting water or food contaminated with feces
Amoebiasis	Entamoeba histolytica	intestines (mainly colon, but can cause liver failure if not treated)	stool (fresh diarrheic stools have amoeba, solid stool has cyst)	areas with poor sanitation, high population density and tropical regions	fecal-oral transmission of cyst, not amoeba
Giardiasis	Giardia lamblia	lumen of the small intestine	stool	worldwide?	ingestion of water containing deer or beaver feces
Isosporiasis	Isospora belli	epithelial cells of small intestines	stool	worldwide – less common than Toxoplasma or Cryptosporidium	fecal oral route – ingestion of sporulated oocyst
Leishmaniasis	Leishmania spp.	cutaneous, mucocutaneous, or visceral	visual identification of lesion or microscopic stain with Leishman's or Giemsa's stain	visceral leishmaniasis – worldwide; cutaneous leishmaniasis – Old World; mucocutaneous leishmaniasis – New World	Phlebotomus, Lutzomyia – bite of several species of phlebotomine sandflies
Primary amoebic meningoencephalitis (PAM)	Naegleria fowleri	brain	culture	unknown, but infection is rare	nasal insufflation of contaminated warm fresh water, poorly chlorinated swimming pools, hot springs, soil
Malaria	Plasmodium falciparum (80% of cases), Plasmodium vivax, Plasmodium ovale curtisi, Plasmodium ovale wallikeri, Plasmodium malariae, Plasmodium knowlesi	red blood cells, liver	blood film	tropical – 250 million cases/year	Anopheles mosquito
Rhinosporidiosis	Rhinosporidium seeberi	nose, nasopharynx	biopsy	India and Sri Lanka	nasal mucosa came into contact with infected material through bathing in common ponds
Sarcocystosis	Sarcocystis bovihominis,Sarcocystis suihominis	intestine, muscle	muscle biopsy	widespread	ingestion of uncooked/undercooked beef/pork with Sarcocystis sarcocysts
Toxoplasmosis (Acute and Latent)	Toxoplasma gondii	eyes, brain, heart, liver	blood and PCR	worldwide: one of the most common human parasites; estimated to infect between 30–50% of the global population.	ingestion of uncooked/undercooked pork/lamb/goat with Toxoplasma bradyzoites, ingestion of raw milk with Toxoplasma tachyzoites, ingestion of contaminated water food or soil with oocysts in cat feces that is more than one day old
Trichomoniasis	Trichomonas vaginalis	female urogenital tract (males asymptomatic)	microscopic examination of genital swab	worldwide	sexually transmitted infection – only trophozoite form (no cysts)
Sleeping sickness	Trypanosoma brucei	brain and blood	microscopic examination of chancre fluid, lymph node aspirates, blood, bone marrow	50,000 to 70,000 people; only found in Africa	tsetse fly, day-biting fly of the genus Glossina
Chagas disease	Trypanosoma cruzi	colon, esophagus, heart, nerves, muscle and blood	Giemsa stain – blood	Mexico, Central America, South America – 16–18 million	Triatoma/Reduviidae – "kissing bug" insect vector, feeds at night

=== Helminths (worms) ===
Helminth organisms (also called helminths or intestinal worms) include:

==== Tapeworms ====
Common name of organism or disease	Latin name (sorted)	Body parts affected	Diagnostic specimen	Prevalence	Transmission/Vector
Tapeworm – Tapeworm infection	Cestoda, Taenia multiceps	intestine	stool	rare worldwide	
Diphyllobothriasis – tapeworm	Diphyllobothrium latum	intestines, blood	stool (microscope)	Europe, Japan, Uganda, Peru, Chile	ingestion of raw fresh water fish
Diphyllobothriasis – tapeworm	Diphyllobothrium pacificum	intestines	stool (microscope)	Peru	ingestion of raw saltwater fish
Echinococcosis – tapeworm	Echinococcus granulosus, Echinococcus multilocularis, E. vogeli, E. oligarthrus	liver, lungs, kidney, spleen	imaging of hydatid cysts in the liver, lungs, kidney and spleen	Worldwide in grazing areas	as intermediate host, ingestion of material contaminated by feces from a carnivore; as definite host, ingestion of uncooked meat (offal) from a herbivore
Hymenolepiasis	Hymenolepis nana, Hymenolepis diminuta				ingestion of material contaminated by flour beetles, mealworms, cockroaches
Beef tapeworm	Taenia saginata	Intestines	stool	worldwide distribution	ingestion of undercooked beef
Cysticercosis-Pork tapeworm	Taenia solium	Brain, muscle, Eye (Cysts in conjunctiva/anterior chamber/sub-retinal space)	stool, blood, imaging of cysts in the brain or any soft tissue	Asia, Africa, South America, Southern Europe, North America.	as definite host: ingestion of undercooked pork; as intermediate host, ingestion of material contaminated by human feces from a person carrying the adult form
Bertielliasis	Bertiella mucronata, Bertiella studeri	Intestines	stool	rare	contact with non-human primates
Sparganosis	Spirometra erinaceieuropaei				ingestion of material contaminated with infected dog or cat feces (humans: dead-end host)

==== Flukes ====
Common name of organism or disease	Latin name (sorted)	Body parts affected	Diagnostic specimen	Prevalence	Transmission/Vector
Clonorchiasis	Clonorchis sinensis; Clonorchis viverrini	gall bladder ducts and inflammation of liver		East Asia	ingestion of under prepared freshwater fish
Lancet liver fluke	Dicrocoelium dendriticum	gall bladder		rare	ingestion of ants
Liver fluke – Fasciolosis	Fasciola hepatica, Fasciola gigantica	liver, gall bladder	stool	Fasciola hepatica in Europe, Africa, Australia, the Americas and Oceania; Fasciola gigantica only in Africa and Asia, 2.4 million people infected by both species	freshwater snails
Fasciolopsiasis – intestinal fluke	Fasciolopsis buski	intestines	stool or vomitus (microscope)	East Asia – 10 million people	ingestion of infested water plants or water (intermediate host: amphibic snails)
Metagonimiasis – intestinal fluke	Metagonimus yokogawai		stool	Siberia, Manchuria, Balkan states, Israel, Spain	ingestion of undercooked or salted fish
Metorchiasis	Metorchis conjunctus			Canada, US, Greenland	ingestion of raw fish
Chinese liver fluke	Opisthorchis viverrini, Opisthorchis felineus, Clonorchis sinensis	bile duct		1.5 million people in Russia	consuming infected raw, slightly salted or frozen fish
Paragonimiasis, lung fluke	Paragonimus westermani; Paragonimus africanus; Paragonimus caliensis; Paragonimus kellicotti; Paragonimus skrjabini; Paragonimus uterobilateralis	lungs	sputum, feces	East Asia	ingestion of raw or undercooked freshwater crabs crayfishes or other crustaceans
Schistosomiasis – bilharzia, bilharziosis or snail fever (all types)	Schistosoma sp.			Africa, Caribbean, eastern South America, east Asia, Middle East – 200 million people	skin exposure to water contaminated with infected freshwater snails
intestinal schistosomiasis	Schistosoma mansoni and Schistosoma intercalatum	intestine, liver, spleen, lungs, skin, rarely infects the brain	stool	Africa, Caribbean, South America, Asia, Middle East – 83 million people	skin exposure to water contaminated with infected Biomphalaria freshwater snails
urinary blood fluke	Schistosoma haematobium	kidney, bladder, ureters, lungs, skin	urine	Africa, Middle East	skin exposure to water contaminated with infected Bulinus sp. snails
Schistosomiasis by Schistosoma japonicum	Schistosoma japonicum	intestine, liver, spleen, lungs, skin	stool	China, East Asia, Philippines	skin exposure to water contaminated with infected Oncomelania sp. snails
Asian intestinal schistosomiasis	Schistosoma mekongi			South East Asia	skin exposure to water contaminated with infected Neotricula aperta – freshwater snails
Echinostomiasis	Echinostoma echinatum	small intestine		Far East	ingestion of raw fish, mollusks, snails
Swimmer's itch	Trichobilharzia regenti, Schistosomatidae			worldwide	skin exposure to contaminated water (snails and vertebrates)

==== Roundworms ====
Disease caused	Latin name (sorted)	Habitat in definite host	Diagnostic Sample	Prevalence	Mode of transmission
Ancylostomiasis/Hookworm	Ancylostoma duodenale, Necator americanus	lungs, small intestine, blood	stool	common in tropical, warm, moist climates	penetration of skin by L3 larva
Angiostrongyliasis	Angiostrongylus	intestine	stool		ingestion of infected faeces or infected slugs
Anisakiasis	Anisakis	allergic reaction	biopsy	incidental host	ingestion of raw fish, squid, cuttlefish, octopus
Roundworm – Parasitic pneumonia	Ascaris sp. Ascaris lumbricoides	Intestines, liver, appendix, pancreas, lungs, Löffler's syndrome	stool	common in tropical and subtropical regions	
Roundworm – Baylisascariasis	Baylisascaris procyonis	Intestines, liver, lungs, brain, eye		rare: North America	stool from raccoons
Roundworm-lymphatic filariasis	Brugia malayi, Brugia timori	lymph nodes	blood samples	tropical regions of Asia	arthropods
Dioctophyme renalis infection	Dioctophyme renale	kidneys (typically the right)	urine	rare	ingestion of undercooked or raw freshwater fish
Ophidascaris robertsi infection	Ophidascaris robertsi	brain		newly discovered infection	Single reported case was likely due to ingestion of gathered wild plants, contaminated with feces from pythons
Guinea worm – Dracunculiasis	Dracunculus medinensis	subcutaneous tissues, muscle	skin blister/ulcer	South Sudan (eradication ongoing)	
Pinworm – Enterobiasis	Enterobius vermicularis, Enterobius gregorii	intestines, anus	stool; tape test around anus	widespread; temperate regions	
Gnathostomiasis	Gnathostoma spinigerum, Gnathostoma hispidum	subcutaneous tissues (under the skin)	physical examination	rare – Southeast Asia	ingestion of raw or undercooked meat (e.g., freshwater fish, chicken, snails, frogs, pigs) or contaminated water
Halicephalobiasis	Halicephalobus gingivalis	brain			soil-contaminated wounds
Loa loa filariasis, Calabar swellings	Loa loa filaria	connective tissue, lungs, eye	blood (Giemsa, haematoxylin, eosin stain)	rain forest of West Africa – 12–13 million people	Tabanidae – horsefly, bites in the day
Mansonelliasis, filariasis	Mansonella streptocerca	subcutaneous layer of skin			insect
River blindness, onchocerciasis	Onchocerca volvulus	skin, eye, tissue	bloodless skin snip	Africa, Yemen, Central and South America near cool, fast flowing rivers	Simulium/black fly, bites during the day
Strongyloidiasis – Parasitic pneumonia	Strongyloides stercoralis	intestines, lungs, skin (Larva currens)	stool, blood		skin penetration
Thelaziasis	Thelazia californiensis, Thelazia callipaeda	eyes	ocular examination	Asia, Europe	Amiota (Phortica) variegata, Phortica okadai
Toxocariasis	Toxocara canis, Toxocara cati, Toxascaris leonina	liver, brain, eyes (Toxocara canis – visceral larva migrans, ocular larva migrans)	blood, ocular examination	worldwide distribution	pica, unwashed food contaminated with Toxocara eggs, undercooked livers of chicken
Trichinosis	Trichinella spiralis, Trichinella britovi, Trichinella nelsoni, Trichinella nativa	muscle, periorbital region, small intestine	blood	more common in developing countries due to improved feeding practices in developed countries.	ingestion of undercooked pork
Whipworm	Trichuris trichiura, Trichuris vulpis	large intestine, anus	stool (eggs)	common worldwide	accidental ingestion of eggs in dry goods such as beans, rice, and various grains or soil contaminated with human feces
Elephantiasis – Lymphatic filariasis	Wuchereria bancrofti	lymphatic system	thick blood smears stained with hematoxylin.	tropical and subtropical	mosquito, bites at night

=== Other organisms ===
Common name of organism or disease	Latin name (sorted)	Body parts affected	Diagnostic specimen	Prevalence	Transmission/Vector
Acanthocephaliasis	Archiacanthocephala, Moniliformis moniliformis	Gastrointestinal tract, peritoneum, eye	Faeces, parasite itself	worldwide	ingestion of intermediate hosts
Halzoun syndrome	Linguatula serrata	nasopharynx	physical examination	Mid East	ingestion of raw or undercooked lymph nodes (e.g., meat from infected camels and buffaloes)
Myiasis	Oestroidea, Calliphoridae, Sarcophagidae	dead or living tissue			
Screwworm, Cochliomyia	Cochliomyia hominivorax (family Calliphoridae)	skin and wounds	visual	North America, Central America, North Africa	direct contact with fly
Chigoe flea	Tunga penetrans	Subcutaneous tissue	physical examination	Central and South America, Sub-Saharan Africa	
Human botfly	Dermatobia hominis	Subcutaneous tissue	physical examination	Central and South America	mosquitoes and biting flies

== Ectoparasites ==
Common name of organism or disease	Latin name (sorted)	Body parts affected	Diagnostic specimen	Prevalence	Transmission/Vector
Head louse – Pediculosis	Pediculus humanus capitis	hair follicles	visual identification under magnification	common worldwide	head-to-head contact
Body louse – Pediculosis	Pediculus humanus humanus	skin	visual identification under magnification (Vagabond's disease)	common worldwide	skin-to-skin contact such as sexual activity and via sharing clothing or bedding
Crab louse –Phthiriasis	Pthirus pubis	pubic area, eyelashes	visual identification under magnification	common worldwide	skin-to-skin contact such as sexual activity and via sharing clothing or bedding
"Chiggers" (Trombiculidae) – Trombiculosis	Arachnida: Trombiculidae	skin	visual identification under magnification, microscopy	worldwide (mesic habitats)	high grass, weeds
Flea	Siphonaptera: Pulicinae	skin	visual identification under magnification	worldwide	environment
Bed bug	Cimicidae: Cimex lectularius and Cimex hemipterus	skin	visual	worldwide	clothing, bedding, personal possessions
Tick	Arachnida: Ixodidae and Argasidae	skin	visual	worldwide	high grass, leaf litter, weeds
Mosquito	Insecta: Diptera	skin	visual	worldwide	high grass, weeds
Demodex – Demodicosis	Demodex folliculorum/brevis/canis	eyebrow, eyelashes, skin, face, scalp	microscopy of eyelash or eyebrow hair follicle, cellophane tape method (CTP), squeezing method, skin scrapings	pandemic, worldwide	Commensal, prolonged skin-to-skin contact
Scabies	Sarcoptes scabiei	skin	microscopy of surface scrapings	worldwide	skin-to-skin contact such as sexual activity and via sharing clothing or bedding
Red mite — Gamasoidosis	Dermanyssus gallinae	skin	visual identification under magnification	worldwide	nesting birds, pets, poultry farming
Northern fowl mite — Gamasoidosis	Ornithonyssus sylviarum	skin	visual identification under magnification	worldwide	nesting birds, poultry farming
Tropical fowl mite — Gamasoidosis	Ornithonyssus bursa	skin	visual identification under magnification	worldwide	nesting birds, poultry farming
Tropical rat mite — Rodent mite dermatitis	Ornithonyssus bacoti	skin	visual identification under magnification	worldwide	rodent infestations
Spiny rat mite — Rodent mite dermatitis	Laelaps echidnina	skin	visual identification under magnification	worldwide	rodent infestations
House mouse mite — Rodent mite dermatitis	Liponyssoides sanguineus	skin	visual identification under magnification	worldwide	rodent infestations
