= Toxocariasis =

Illness of humans caused by larvae of the dog or the cat roundworm

- Specialty: Parasitology, infectious disease
- Symptoms: fever, enlarged lymph nodes, cough, bronchospasm, wheezing, abdominal pain, headaches, shortness of breath, visual impairment
- Complications: respiratory failure, meningitis, encephalitis, epileptic seizures, myocarditis, blindness
- Causes: dog roundworm (Toxocara canis), cat roundworm (Toxocara cati)
- Diagnostic method: serologic testing (serum total IgE, ELISA to detect specific anti-Toxocara IgE)
- Differential diagnosis: Baylisascaris procyonis, filariasis
- Prevention: control of parasites in domestic dogs and cats, proper disposal of pet feces, proper handling of food, hand hygiene
- Treatment: anthelmintic medications
- Medication: albendazole, diethylcarbamazine

Toxocariasis is an illness of humans caused by the dog roundworm (Toxocara canis) and, less frequently, the cat roundworm (Toxocara cati). These are the most common intestinal roundworms of dogs, coyotes, wolves and foxes and domestic cats, respectively. Humans are among the many "accidental" or paratenic hosts of these roundworms.

While this zoonotic infection is usually asymptomatic, it may cause severe disease. There are three distinct syndromes of toxocariasis: covert toxocariasis is a relatively mild illness very similar to Löffler's syndrome. It is characterized by fever, eosinophilia, urticaria, enlarged lymph nodes, cough, bronchospasm, wheezing, abdominal pain, headaches, and/or hepatosplenomegaly. Visceral larva migrans (VLM) is a more severe form of the disease; signs and symptoms depend on the specific organ system(s) involved. Lung involvement may manifest as shortness of breath, interstitial lung disease, pleural effusion, and even respiratory failure. Brain involvement may manifest as meningitis, encephalitis, or epileptic seizures. Cardiac involvement may manifest as myocarditis. Ocular larva migrans (OLM) is the third syndrome, manifesting as uveitis, endophthalmitis, visual impairment or even blindness in the affected eye.

== Signs and symptoms ==
Physiological reactions to Toxocara infection depend on the host's immune response and the parasitic load. Most cases of Toxocara infection are asymptomatic, especially in adults. When symptoms do occur, they are the result of migration of second-stage Toxocara larvae through the body.

=== Covert toxocariasis ===
Covert toxocariasis is the least serious of the three syndromes and is believed to be due to chronic exposure. Signs and symptoms of covert toxocariasis are coughing, fever, abdominal pain, headaches, and changes in behavior and ability to sleep. Upon medical examination, wheezing, hepatomegaly, and lymphadenitis are often noted.

=== Visceral larva migrans ===
High parasitic loads or repeated infection can lead to visceral larva migrans (VLM). VLM is primarily diagnosed in young children because they are more prone to exposure and ingestion of infective eggs. Toxocara infection commonly resolves itself within weeks, but chronic eosinophilia may result. In VLM, larvae migration incites inflammation of internal organs and sometimes the central nervous system. Symptoms depend on the organs affected. Children can present with pallor, fatigue, weight loss, anorexia, fever, headache, urticaria skin rash, cough, asthma, chest tightness, increased irritability, abdominal pain, nausea, and vomiting. Sometimes the subcutaneous migration tracks of the larvae can be seen. Children are commonly diagnosed with pneumonia, bronchospasms, chronic pulmonary inflammation, hypereosinophilia, hepatomegaly, hypergammaglobulinaemia (IgM, IgG, and IgE classes), leukocytosis, and elevated anti-A and anti-B isohaemagglutinins. Severe cases have occurred in people who are hypersensitive to allergens; in rare cases, epilepsy, inflammation of the heart, pleural effusion, respiratory failure, and death have resulted from VLM.

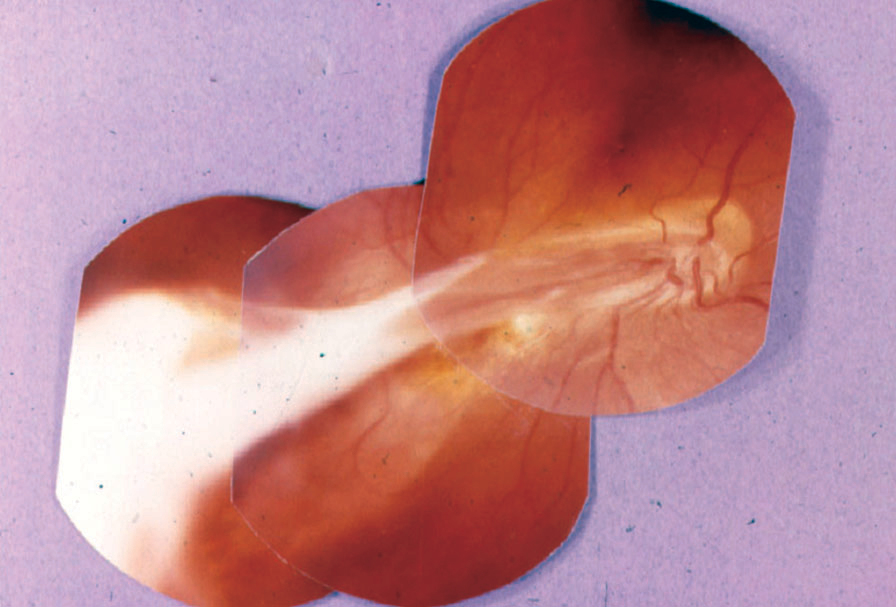
Retinal granuloma in ocular toxocariasis

=== Ocular larva migrans ===
Ocular larva migrans (OLM) is rare compared with VLM. A light Toxocara burden is thought to induce a low immune response, allowing a larva to enter the host's eye. Although there have been cases of concurrent OLM and VLM, these are extremely exceptional. OLM often occurs in just one eye and from a single larva migrating into and encysting within the orbit. Loss of vision occurs over days or weeks. Other signs and symptoms are red eye, white pupil, fixed pupil, retinal fibrosis, retinal detachment, inflammation of the eye tissues, retinal granulomas, and strabismus. Ocular granulomas resulting from OLM are frequently misdiagnosed as retinoblastomas. Toxocara damage in the eye is permanent and can result in blindness.

=== Other ===
Skin manifestations commonly include chronic urticaria, chronic pruritus, and miscellaneous forms of eczema. A case study published in 2008 supported the hypothesis that eosinophilic cellulitis may also be caused by infection with Toxocara: the adult patient presented with eosinophilic cellulitis, hepatosplenomegaly, anemia, and a positive ELISA for T. canis.

== Cause ==
=== Transmission ===
Toxocara is usually transmitted to humans through ingestion of infective eggs. T. canis can lay around 200,000 eggs per day. These eggs are passed in cat or dog feces, but the defecation habits of dogs cause T. canis transmission to be more common than that of T. cati. Both Toxocara canis and Toxocara cati eggs require a several week incubation period in moist, humid weather outside a host before becoming infective, so fresh eggs cannot cause toxocariasis.

Many objects and surfaces can become contaminated with infectious Toxocara eggs. Flies that feed on feces can spread Toxocara eggs to surfaces or foods. Young children who put contaminated objects in their mouths or eat dirt (pica) are at risk of developing symptoms. Humans can also contaminate foods by not washing their hands before eating.

Humans are not the only accidental hosts of Toxocara. Eating undercooked rabbit, chicken, or sheep can lead to infection; encysted larvae in the meat can become reactivated and migrate through a human host, causing toxocariasis. Special attention should be paid to thoroughly cooking giblets and liver to avoid transmission.

=== Incubation period ===
The incubation period for Toxocara canis and cati eggs depends on temperature and humidity. T. canis females, specifically, are capable of producing up to 200,000 eggs a day that require 2–6 weeks minimum up to a couple months before full development into the infectious stage. Under ideal summer conditions, eggs can mature to the infective stage after two weeks outside of a host. Provided sufficient oxygen and moisture availability, Toxocara eggs can remain infectious for years, as their resistant outer shell enables protection from most environmental threats. However, as identified in a case study presented within the journal of helminthology, the second stage of larvae development poses strict vulnerabilities to certain environmental elements. High temperatures and low moisture levels will quickly degrade the larvae during this developmental stage.

Toxocara

Scientific classification
- Kingdom: Animalia
- Phylum: Nematoda
- Class: Chromadorea
- Order: Rhabditida
- Family: Toxocaridae
- Genus: Toxocara

Species
- Species include: Toxocara canis; Toxocara cati; Toxocara malaysiensis; Toxocara tanuki; Toxocara vitulorum

=== Reservoir ===
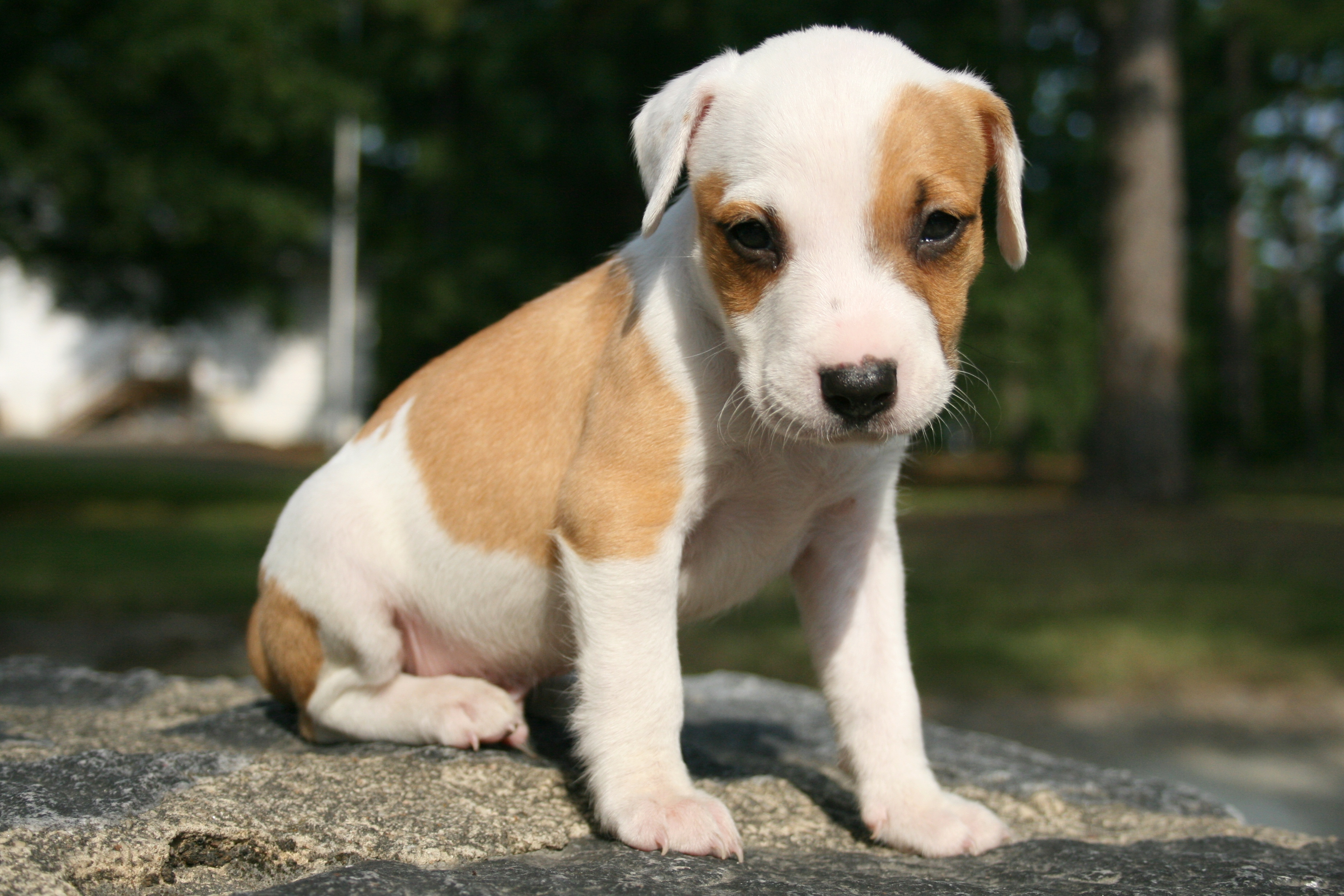
Puppies are the major source of environmental contamination with roundworm eggs

Dogs and foxes are the reservoir for Toxocara canis, but puppies and cubs pose the greatest risk of spreading the infection to humans. Infection in most adult dogs is characterized by encysted second-stage larvae. However, these larvae can reactivate in pregnant females and cross the placental barrier to infect the pups. Vertical transmission can also occur through breast milk. Infectious mothers, and puppies under five weeks old, pass eggs in their feces. Approximately 50% of puppies and 20% of adult dogs are infected with T. canis.

Cats are the reservoir for Toxocara cati. As with T. canis, encysted second-stage larvae in pregnant or lactating cats reactivate. However, vertical transmission can only occur through breastfeeding.

Flies can act as mechanical vectors for Toxocara, but most infections occur without a vector. Most incidents with Toxocariasis result from prokaryotic expression vectors and their transmission through direct physical contact with feces that results in the contraction of the illness.

=== Morphology ===
Both species produce eggs that are brown and pitted. T. canis eggs measure 75-90 μm and are spherical, whereas the eggs of T. cati are 65-70 μm in diameter and oblong. Second-stage larvae hatch from these eggs and are approximately 0.5mm long and 0.02mm wide. Adults of both species have complete digestive systems and three lips, each composed of a dentigerous ridge.

Adult T. canis are found only within dogs and foxes and the males are 4–6 cm in length, with a curved posterior end. The males each have spicules and one "tubular testis." Females can be as long as 15 cm, with the vulva stretching one-third of their body length. The females do not curve at the posterior end.

T. cati adult females are approximately 10 cm long, while males are typically 6 cm or less. The T. cati adults only occur within cats, and male T. cati are curved at the posterior end.

=== Life cycle ===
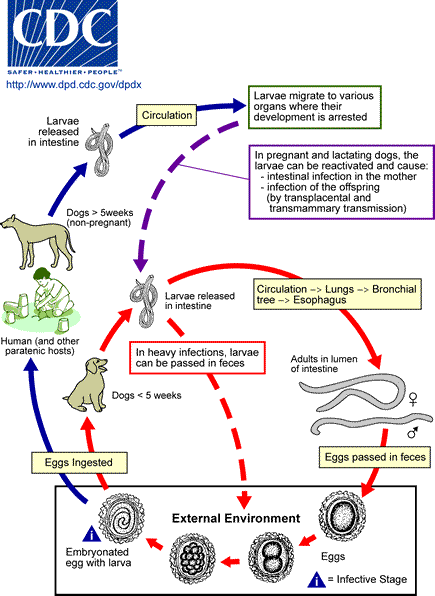

Cats, dogs, and foxes can become infected with Toxocara through the ingestion of eggs or by transmission of the larvae from a mother to her offspring. Transmission to cats and dogs can also occur by ingestion of infected accidental hosts, such as earthworms, cockroaches, rodents, rabbits, chickens, or sheep.

Eggs hatch as second-stage larvae in the intestines of the cat, dog, or fox host (for consistency, this article will assume that second-stage larvae emerge from Toxocara eggs, although there is debate as to whether larvae are truly in their second or third stage of development). Larvae enter the bloodstream and migrate to the lungs, where they are coughed up and swallowed. The larvae mature into adults within the small intestine of a cat, dog, or fox, where mating and egg-laying occurs. Eggs are passed in the feces and only become infective after three weeks outside of a host. During this incubation period, molting from first to second (and possibly third) stage larva takes place within the egg. In most adult dogs, cats and foxes, the full lifecycle does not occur, but instead second stage larvae encyst after a period of migration through the body. Reactivation of the larvae is common only in pregnant or lactating cats, dogs and foxes. The full lifecycle usually only occurs in these females and their offspring.

Second-stage larvae will also hatch in the small intestine of an accidental host, such as a human, after ingestion of infective eggs. The larvae will then migrate through the organs and tissues of the accidental host, most commonly the lungs, liver, eyes, and brain. Since L2 larvae cannot mature in accidental hosts, after this period of migration, Toxocara larvae will encyst as second stage larvae.

== Diagnosis ==
Finding Toxocara larvae within a patient is the only definitive diagnosis for toxocariasis; however, biopsies to look for second-stage larvae in humans are generally not very effective. PCR, ELISA, and serological testing are more commonly used to diagnose Toxocara infection. Serological tests are dependent on the number of larvae within the patient, and are unfortunately not very specific. ELISAs are much more reliable and currently have a 78% sensitivity and a 90% specificity. A 2007 study announced an ELISA specific to Toxocara canis, which will minimize false positives from cross reactions with similar roundworms and will help distinguish if a patient is infected with T. canis or T. cati. OLM is often diagnosed after a clinical examination. Granulomas can be found throughout the body and can be visualized using ultrasound, MRI, and CT technologies.

== Prevention ==
Actively involving veterinarians and pet owners is important for controlling the transmission of Toxocara from pets to humans. A group very actively involved in promoting a reduction of infections in dogs in the United States is the Companion Animal Parasite Council -- CAPC. Since pregnant or lactating dogs and cats and their offspring have the highest, active parasitic load, these animals should be placed on a deworming program. Pet feces should be picked up and disposed of or buried, as they may contain Toxocara eggs. Practicing this measure in public areas, such as parks and beaches, is especially essential for decreasing transmission. Up to 20% of soil samples of U.S. playgrounds have found roundworm eggs. Also, sandboxes should be covered when not in use to prevent cats from using them as litter boxes. Hand washing before eating and after playing with pets, as well as after handling dirt will reduce the chances of ingesting Toxocara eggs. Washing all fruits and vegetables, keeping pets out of gardens, and thoroughly cooking meats can also prevent transmission. Finally, teaching children not to place nonfood items, especially dirt, in their mouths will drastically reduce the chances of infection.

Toxocariasis has been named one of the neglected diseases of US poverty, because of its prevalence in Appalachia, the southern U.S., inner city settings, and minority populations.

There is currently no vaccine available or under development. The mitochondrial genomes of both T. cati and T. canis have been sequenced in 2008, which could lead to breakthroughs in treatment and prevention.

== Treatment ==
Toxocariasis will often resolve itself because the Toxocara larvae cannot mature within human hosts. Corticosteroids are prescribed in severe cases of VLM or if the patient is diagnosed with OLM. Either albendazole (preferred) or mebendazole ("second line therapy") may be prescribed. Granulomas can be surgically removed, or laser photocoagulation and cryoretinopexy can be used to destroy ocular granulomas.

Visceral toxocariasis in humans can be treated with antiparasitic drugs such as albendazole or mebendazole, tiabendazole or diethylcarbamazine usually in combination with anti-inflammatory medications. Steroids have been utilized with some positive results. Anti-helminthic therapy is reserved for severe infections (lungs, brain) because therapy may induce, due to massive larval killing, a strong inflammatory response. Ocular toxocariasis is more difficult to treat and usually consists of measures to prevent progressive damage to the eye.

== Epidemiology ==
Humans are accidental hosts of Toxocara, yet toxocariasis is seen throughout the world. Most cases of toxocariasis are seen in people under the age of twenty. Seroprevalence is higher in developing countries but can be considerable in first world countries, as well. In Bali, St. Lucia, Nepal, and other countries, seroprevalence is over fifty percent. Previous to 2007, the U.S. seroprevalence was thought to be around 5% in children. However, Won et al. discovered that U.S. seroprevalence is 14% for the population at large. In many countries, toxocariasis is considered very rare. Approximately 10,000 clinical cases are seen a year in the U.S., with ten percent being OLM. Permanent vision loss occurs in 700 of these cases.

Young children are at the greatest risk of infection because they play outside and tend to place contaminated objects and dirt in their mouths. Dog ownership is another known risk factor for transmission. There is also a significant correlation between high Toxocara antibody titers and epilepsy in children.

Parasitic loads as high as 300 larvae in a single gram of liver have been noted in humans. The "excretory-secretory antigens of larvae ... released from their outer epicuticle coat [and] ... readily sloughed off when bound by specific antibodies" incite the host's immune response. The tipping point between the development of VLM and OLM is believed to be between 100 and 200 larvae. The lighter infection in OLM is believed to stimulate a lower immune response and allow for the migration of a larva into the eye. Larvae are thought to enter the eye through the optic nerve, central retinal artery, short posterior ciliary arteries, soft tissues, or cerebrospinal fluid. Ocular granulomas that form around a larva typically are peripheral in the retina or optic disc.

Visceral larva migrans seems to affect children aged 1–4 more often while Ocular larva migrans more frequently affects children aged 7–8. Between 4.6% and 23% of US children have been infected with the dog roundworm egg. This number is much higher in other parts of the world, in tropical countries there is seroprevalence of up to 80–90%, such as Colombia, where up to 81% of children have been infected, or Honduras where seroprevalence among school-age children was reported to be 88%. In the western part of the world, seroprevalence is lower, around 35–42%.

== History ==
Werner described a parasitic nematode in dogs in 1782 which he named Ascaris canis. Johnston determined that what Werner had described was actually a member of the genus Toxocara established by Stiles in 1905. Fülleborn speculated that T canis larvae might cause granulomatous nodules in humans. In 1947 Perlingiero and Gyorgy described the first case of what was probably toxocariasis. Their patient was a 2-year-old boy from Florida who had classical symptoms and eosinophilic necrotizing granulomas. In 1950, Campbell-Wilder was the first to describe toxocariasis in humans; she published a paper describing ocular granulomas in patients with endophthalmitis, Coat's disease, or pseudoglioma. Two years later, Beaver et al. published the presence of Toxocara larvae in granulomas removed from patients with symptoms similar to those in Wilder's patients. The dangers of toxocariasis were first raised in Britain in the 1970s, leading to a public health scare.

== Other animals ==
=== Cats ===
Some treatments for infection with Toxocara cati include drugs designed to cause the adult worms to become partially anaesthetized and detach from the intestinal lining, allowing them to be excreted live in the feces. Such medications include piperazine and pyrantel. These are frequently combined with the drug praziquantel which appears to cause the worm to lose its resistance to being digested by the host animal. Other effective treatments include ivermectin, milbemycin, and selamectin. Dichlorvos has also been proven to be effective as a poison, though moves to ban it over concerns about its toxicity have made it unavailable in some areas.

Treatment for wild felids, however, is difficult for this parasite, as detection is the best way to find which individuals have the parasite. This can be difficult as infected species are hard to detect. Once detected, the infected individuals would have to be removed from the population, to lower the risk of continual exposure to the parasites. A primary method that has been used to lower the amount of infection is removal through hunting. Removal can also occur through landowners, as Dare and Watkins (2012) discovered through their research on cougars. Both hunters and landowners can provide samples that can be used to detect the presence of feline roundworm in the area, as well as help remove it from the population. This method is more practical than administering medications to wild populations, as wild animals, as mentioned before, are harder to find in order to administer medicinal care.

Medicinal care, however, is also another method used in roundworm studies; such as the experiment on managing raccoon roundworm done by Smyser et al. (2013) in which they implemented medical baiting. However, medicine is often expensive and the success of the baiting depends on whether the infected individuals consume the bait. Additionally, it can be costly (in time and resources) to check on baited areas. Removal by hunting allows agencies to reduce costs and gives agencies a more improved chance of removing infected individuals.
