= Toxocara malayasiensis =

Scientific classification
- Kingdom: Animalia
- Phylum: Nematoda
- Class: Chromadorea
- Order: Rhabditida
- Family: Toxocaridae
- Genus: Toxocara
- Species: T. malayasiensis

Binomial name
- Toxocara malayasiensis Gibbons et al., 2001

Species of roundworm

Toxocara malayasiensis is a species of feline roundworm, a parasite which infects the intestine of cats. Feline roundworms are passed in the fecal matter of cats, and can be transmitted to humans, causing toxocariasis, a potentially serious disease. Though it may be zoonotic, it is not clear to what extent.

== See also ==
- List of parasites (human)
- Susceptibility and severity of infections in pregnancy
- Feline zoonosis
