= Larva migrans =

Larva migrans generally refers to disease caused by the migration of the larvae of a helminth to various tissues. Some variants of larva migrans include:

- Cutaneous Larva Migrans (CLM), a skin disease in humans, caused by the larvae of various nematode parasites
- Visceral Larva Migrans (VLM), a condition caused by the migratory larvae of nematodes in the viscera
- Ocular Larva Migrans (OLM), an ocular form of larva migrans that occurs when larvae invade the eye
- Larva Migrans Profundus, also known as Gnathostomiasis
- Neural Larva Migrans (NLM), invasion by larvae of the central nervous system
