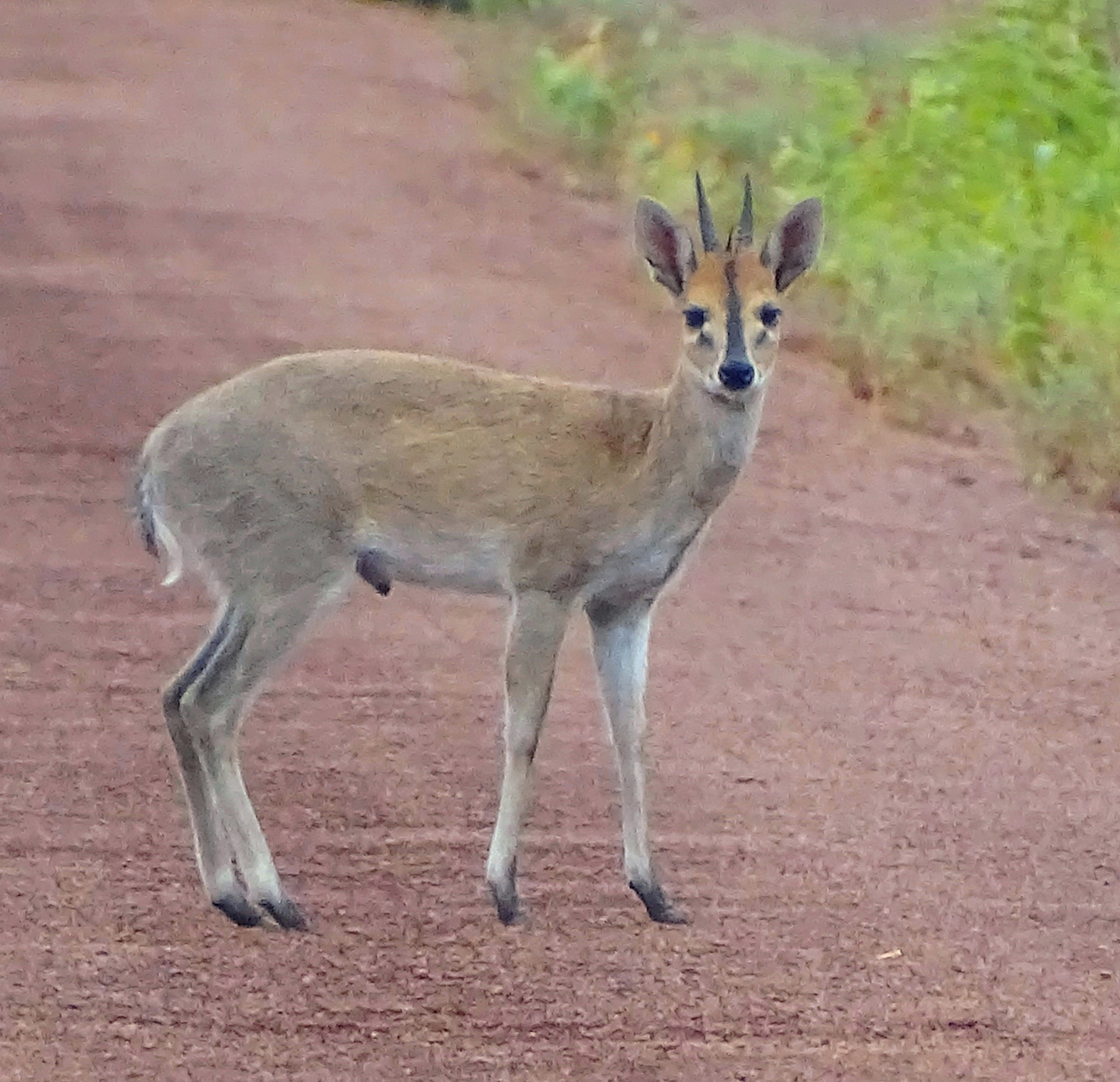
- Adult male in Pendjari National Park, Benin
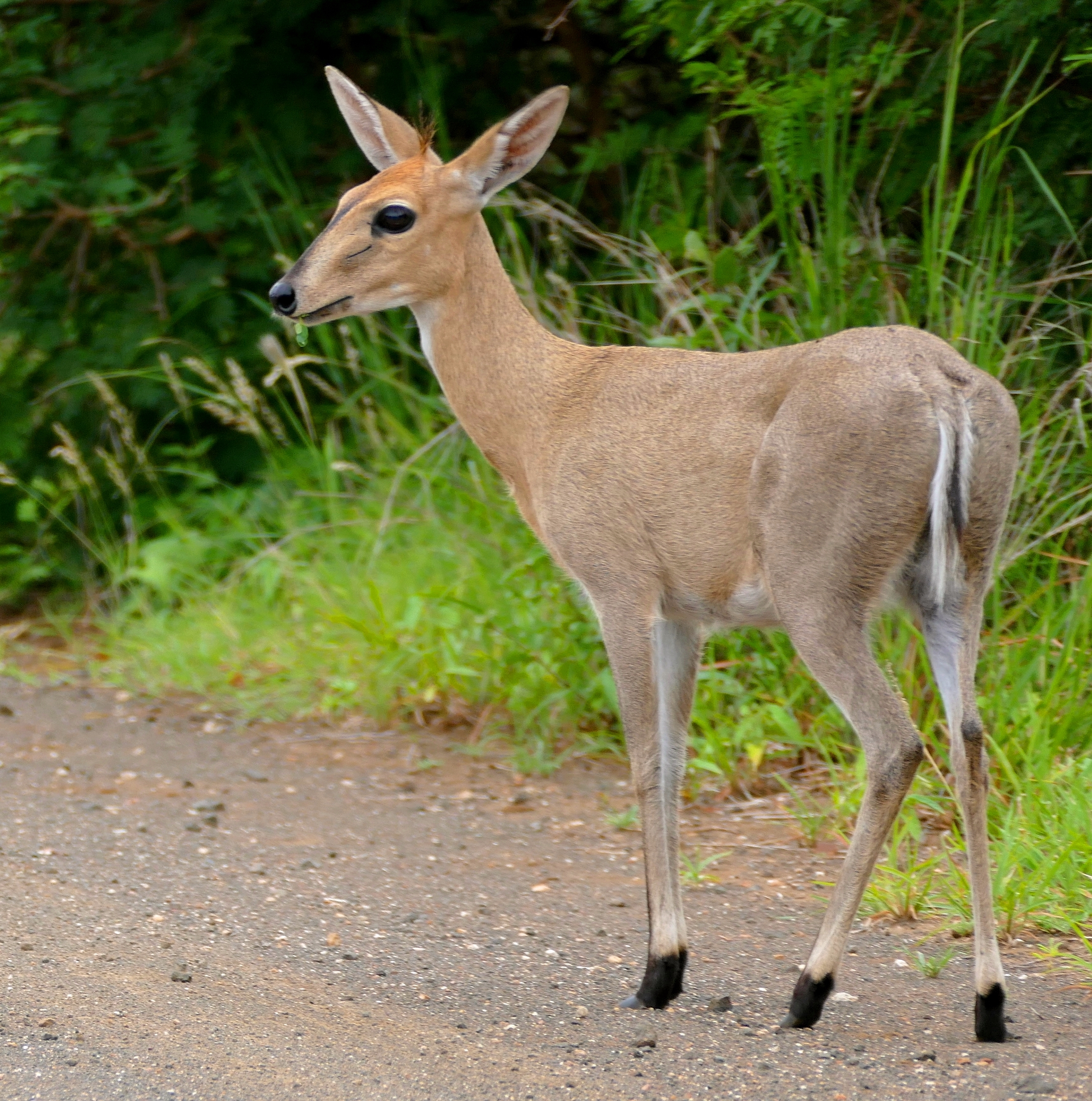
- Adult female in the Kruger National Park, South Africa

Conservation status
- Least Concern (IUCN 3.1)

Scientific classification
- Kingdom: Animalia
- Phylum: Chordata
- Class: Mammalia
- Infraclass: Placentalia
- Order: Artiodactyla
- Family: Bovidae
- Subfamily: Cephalophinae
- Genus: Sylvicapra; Ogilby, 1837
- Species: S. grimmia

Binomial name
- Sylvicapra grimmia (Linnaeus, 1758)

Synonyms
- Capra grimmia Linnaeus, 1758; Moschus grimmia Linnaeus, 1766

= Common duiker =

Species of mammal

The common duiker (Sylvicapra grimmia), also known as the gray duiker or bush duiker, is a small antelope and the only member of the genus Sylvicapra. This species is found everywhere in Africa south of the Sahara, excluding the Horn of Africa and the rainforests of the central and western parts of the continent. Generally, they are found in habitats with sufficient vegetation cover to allow them to hide—savannah and hilly areas, including the fringes of human settlements.

== Description ==
Colouration of this species varies widely over its vast geographic range. There are 14 subspecies described, ranging from chestnut in forested areas of Angola to grizzled gray in northern savannas and light brown shades in arid regions. It grows to about 50 cm (20 in) in height and generally weighs 12 to 25 kg (26 to 55 lb); females are generally larger and heavier than the males. Only the male has horns and these can grow to 11 cm (4.3 in) long.

== Behavior ==
Breeding is year round and the female gives birth to one fawn after a gestation period of 6 to 7.5 months.

The common duiker has a wide diet; beyond browsing for leaves, flowers, fruits and tubers, they will also eat insects, frogs, small birds and mammals, and even carrion. Because the common duiker can eat diverse items, they are able to consume from burnt habitat prior to species that have more restricted diets. This versatility in diet means that common duikers can persist on agricultural land more effectively than species with larger body size and narrower dietary requirements.

As long as they have vegetation to eat (from which they obtain some water), they can go without drinking for very long periods. In the rainy season, they frequently do not drink water at all, instead obtaining fluids from fruits. They will often scavenge for these fruits below trees in which monkeys are feeding. They are active both day and night, but become more nocturnal near human settlements, presumably due to the presence of feral dogs and humans.

Males are territorial and smear liquid secretions from their preorbital glands situated beneath their eyes on rocks and branches to mark their territories. Their preferred resting places are generally on elevated ground, where they can observe their territory. Females, by contrast, prefer deeper cover. The overall success of this species stems from its ability to inhabit a wide variety of habitats, as well as from its adaptable, generalist diet.

Although they can persist on land also used for domesticated animals, this potential conflict can actual be an advantage when farmers use other animals such as donkeys to protect their livestock, and these livestock guardian species also guard other prey species such as the common duiker from predation.

== Vulnerability to parasites ==
Both captive and wild common duikers have been observed to be susceptible to several species of endoparasites. These endoparasites include at least two species of threadworms including Strongyloides papillosus, a species of helminth worm from the genus Trichuris (Trichuris globulosa), the blood fluke worm species Schistossoma spindale, and a species of nematode worm (Toxocara vitulorum). Common duikers can also act as hosts of the parasite Trypanosoma brucei that causes sleeping sickness in humans.

== Gallery ==
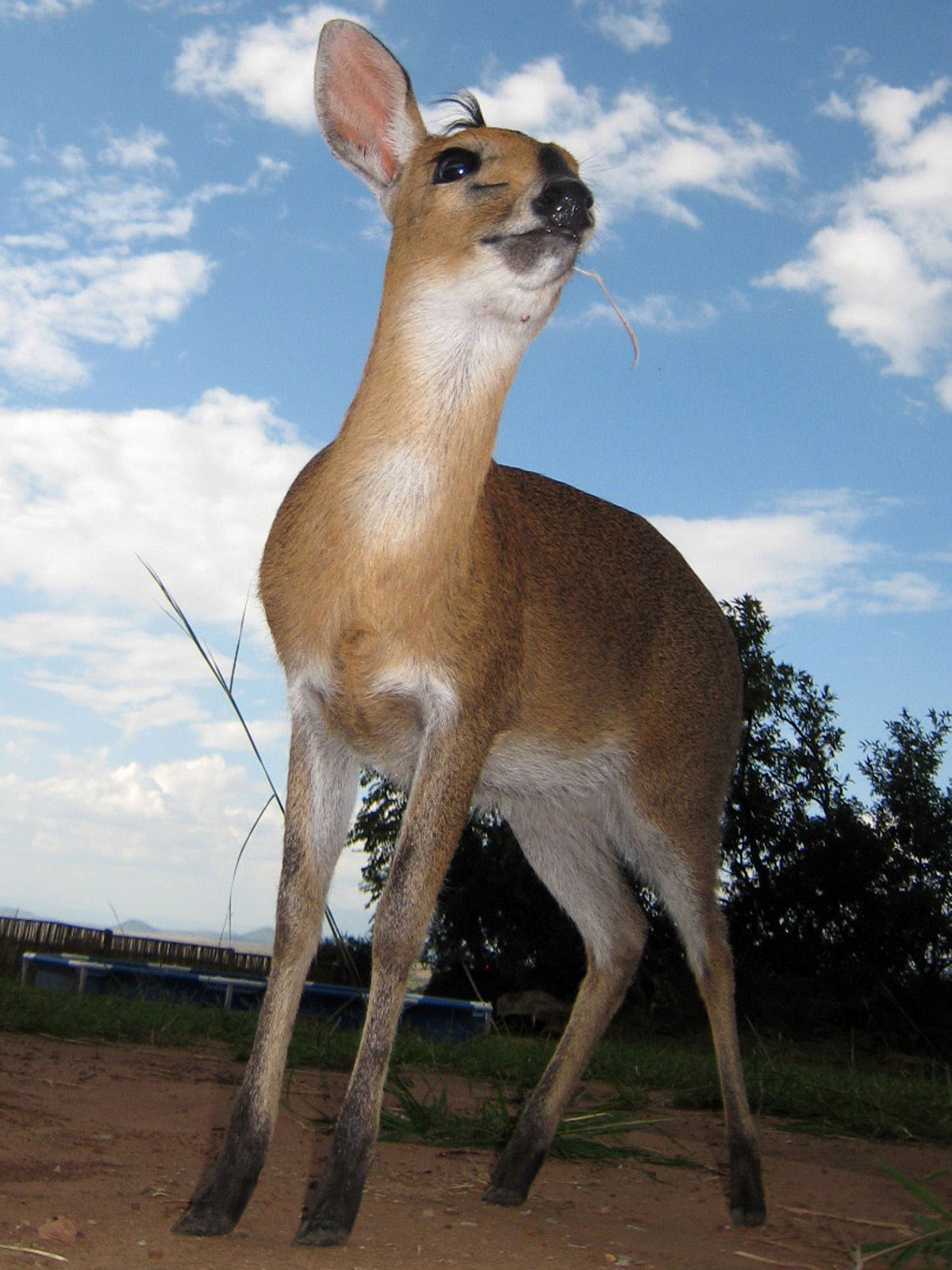
Juvenile male, Kidepo Valley N.P., Uganda

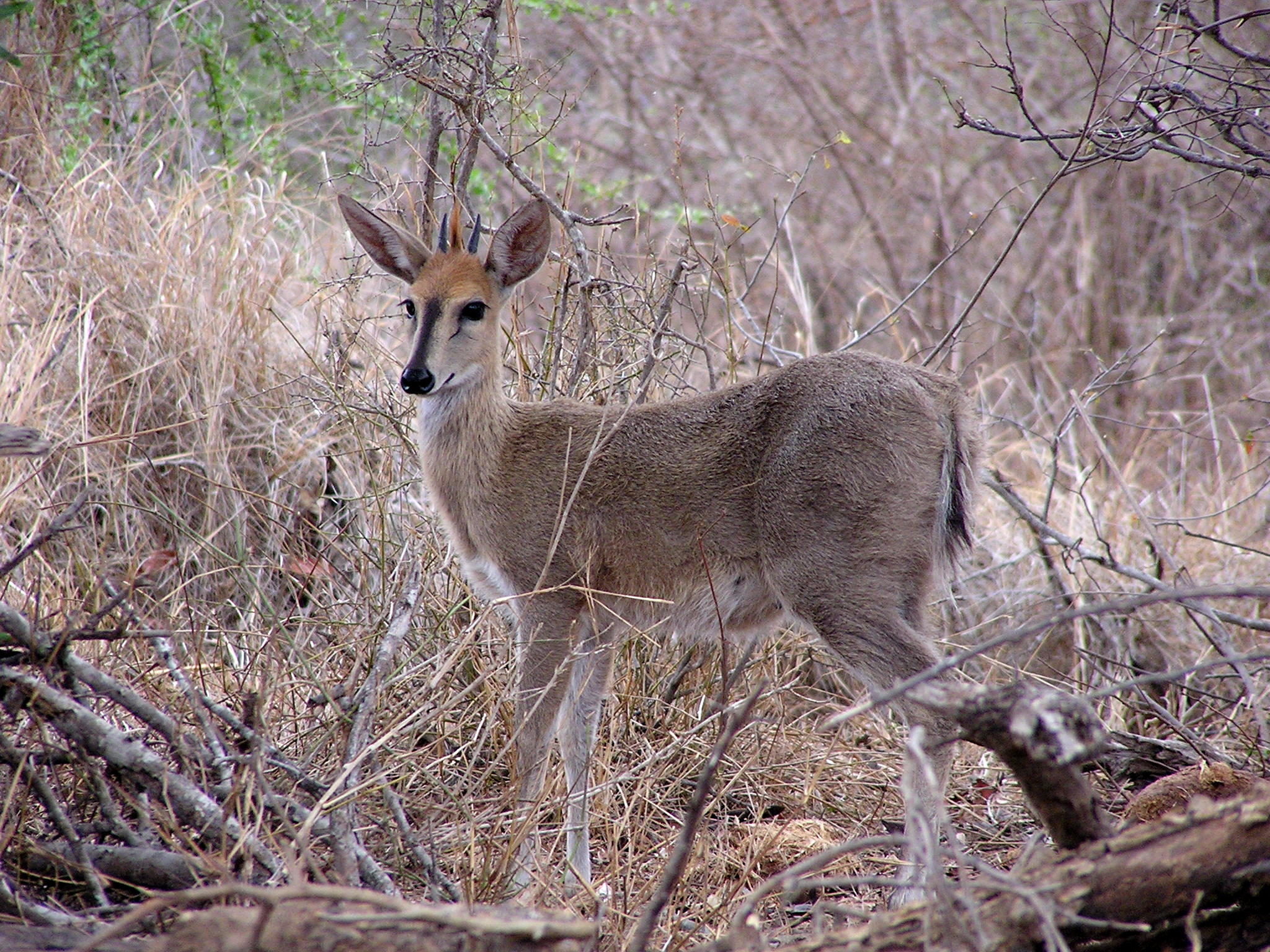
young male in Kruger Park

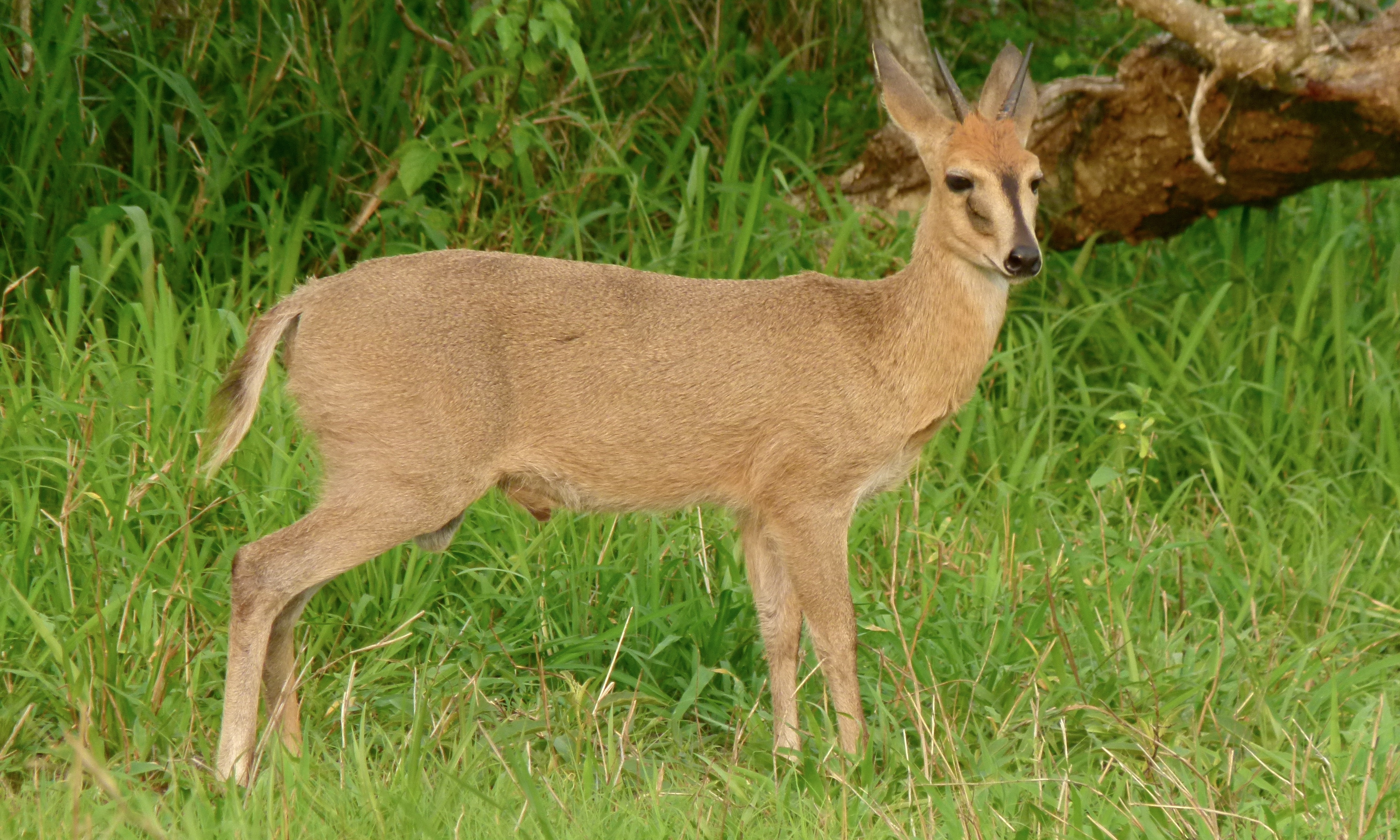
adult male in Kruger Park

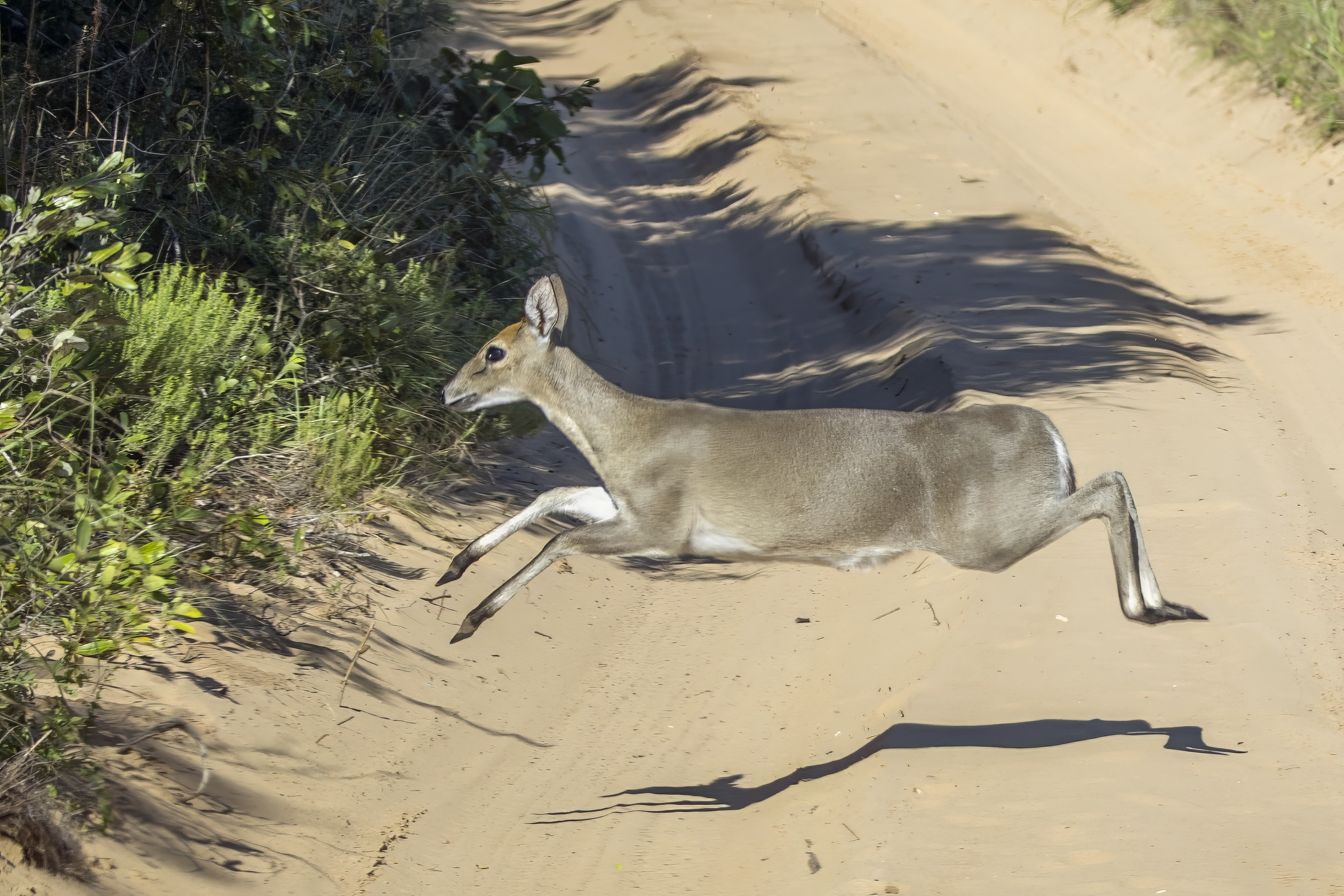
female, Maputo National Park, Mozambique
