= Baylisascaris schroederi =

Scientific classification
- Kingdom: Animalia
- Phylum: Nematoda
- Class: Chromadorea
- Order: Rhabditida
- Family: Ascarididae
- Genus: Baylisascaris
- Species: B. schroederi

Binomial name
- Baylisascaris schroederi McIntosh, 1939

Species of roundworm

Baylisascaris schroederi is a species of roundworm in the family Ascarididae. It occurs in China and is a parasite of giant pandas. Many wild giant pandas are infected with this parasite and heavy infections can lead to the death of the animal.
