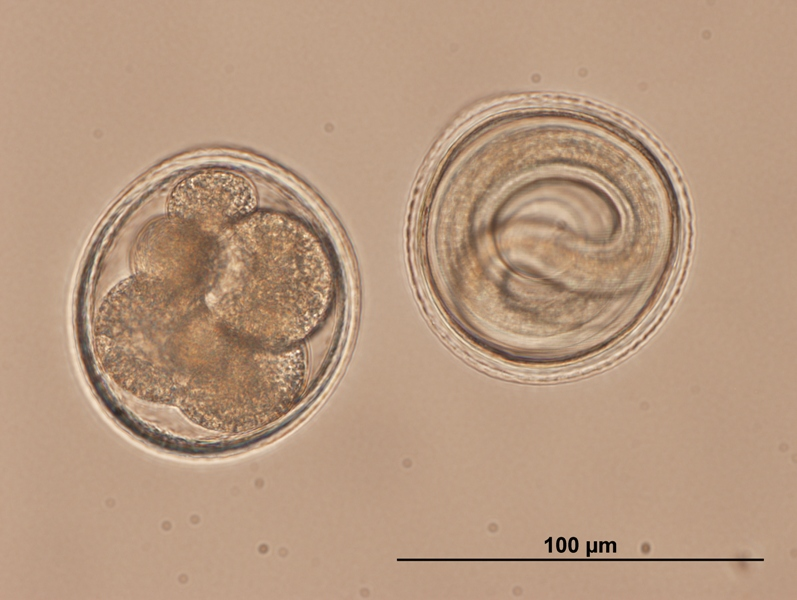
- Toxocara embryonated eggs

Scientific classification
- Kingdom: Animalia
- Phylum: Nematoda
- Class: Chromadorea
- Order: Rhabditida
- Superfamily: Ascaridoidea
- Family: Toxocaridae

Genera
- See text

= Toxocaridae =

Family of roundworms

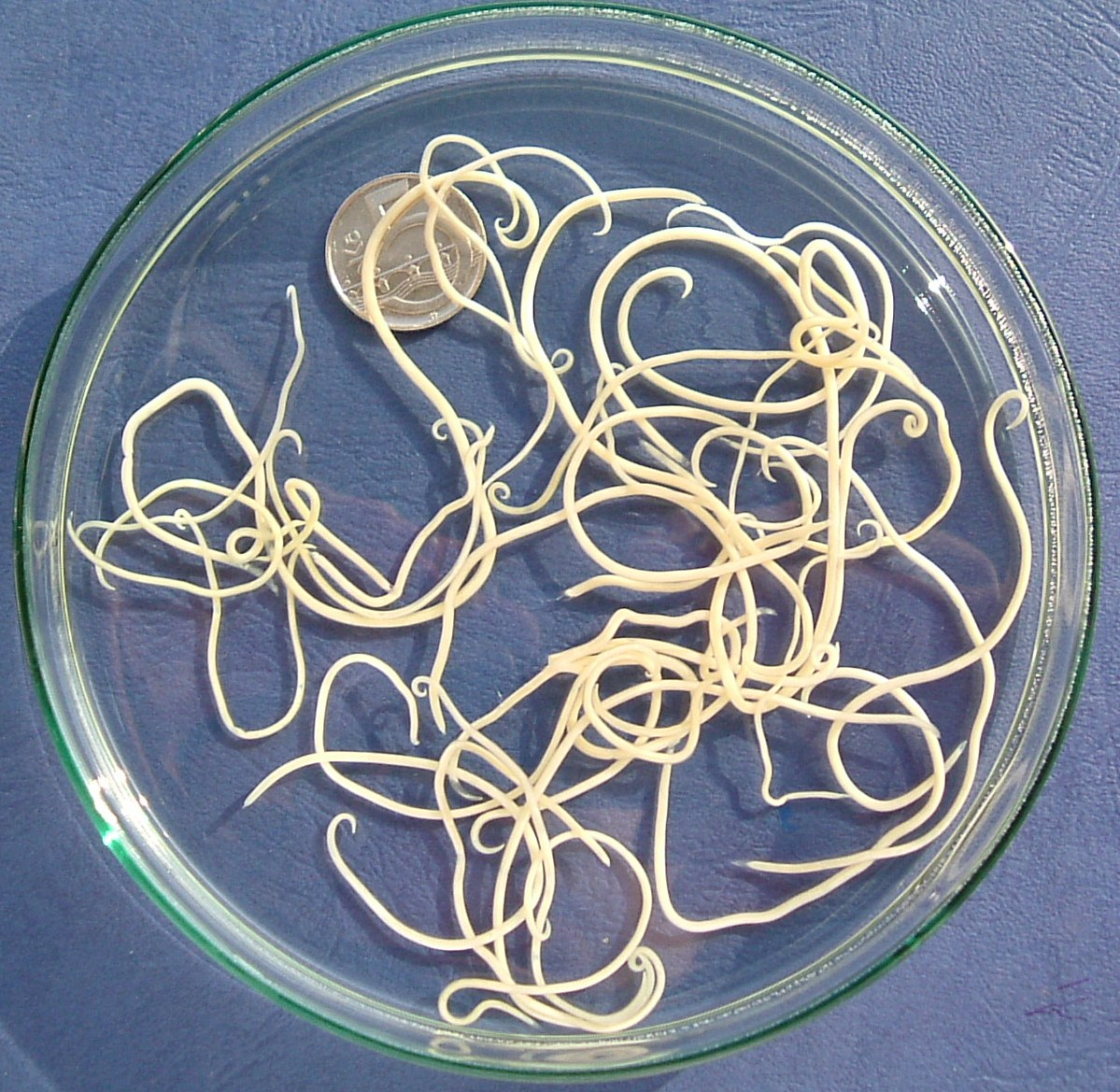
Toxocara canis adult worms

The Toxocaridae are a zoonotic family of parasitic nematodes that infect canids and felids and which cause toxocariasis in humans (visceral larva migrans and ocular larva migrans). The worms are unable to reproduce in humans.

Notable species include:

- Toxocara canis, which infects dogs.
- Toxocara cati, which infects cats and lacks intermediate hosts.
- Toxascaris leonina, which infects mostly cats, but also dogs.
- Toxocara malayasiensis, which infects cats.
- Toxocara vitulorum, which infects buffalo and cattle.

== Infection ==
Infection by T. canis or T. cati can cause various clinical manifestations. One of these is visceral larva migrans, wherein the larvae are unable to develop in humans as they do in cats and dogs, their natural hosts. Arrested development leaves the larvae to wander aimlessly in the body, causing inflammation, most commonly in the liver and lungs.

Eggs are introduced into the body through ingestion. This can occur when eggs are deposited on the hands or face, after handling infected dogs or cats. In some cases, they can also get them from undercooked meat. In children without exposure to animals, eggs can be introduced by directly ingesting egg-contaminated soil while playing in a yard or on a playground. Usually, the scenario involves a young child with a new puppy. Unfortunately, many young children who have been infected with these larvae, causing ocular larva migrans in the eye, have been misdiagnosed to have retinoblastoma and have had their eyes erroneously removed.

== Diagnosis ==
Direct identification of larvae in human disease is not feasible, so the diagnosis relies on history supported by serologic ELISA assay. The most sensitive assay, called excretory/secretory (E/S), contains 96 immunogenic antigens isolated from cultured T. canis larvae.

== Prevention ==
A number of products supplied by veterinarians can prevent or treat infections with this parasite. A great deal of information on this subject can be found on the computer sites maintained by the Companion Animal Parasite Council.

== Treatment ==
Visceral toxocariasis in humans (or dogs) can be treated with antiparasitic drugs such as albendazole or mebendazole, usually in combination with anti-inflammatory medications. Treatment for ocular larva migrans is to kill the larvae with a laser to prevent further damage, although some loss of vision in the affected eye is irreversible.

== Association with asthma ==
Infection with Toxocara has been shown to stimulate atopic disease, specifically asthma. Infection with this parasite causes asthma-like symptoms such as accumulation of eosinophils, an inflammatory response, and production of IgE, the immunoglobulins associated with allergic responses. People with asthma are shown to have a higher prevalence of Toxocara seropositivity. Research suggests that the IgE production stimulated by infection with Toxocara may contribute to the onsets of allergic asthma in children. The effects of how parasite load, frequency of exposure, and influence of genetics affect this relationship between Toxocara infection and allergic asthma are still unknown, yet important in understanding how to prevent asthma and other atopic diseases around the globe.

== Epidemiology ==
Toxocara canis and Toxocara cati are species of Toxocara whose definitive hosts are primarily dogs and cats, respectively. Reported infection rates in Western Europe range from 3.5% to 34% for T. canis in dogs and from 8% to 76% for T. cati in cats.

== See also ==
- Toxocariasis
