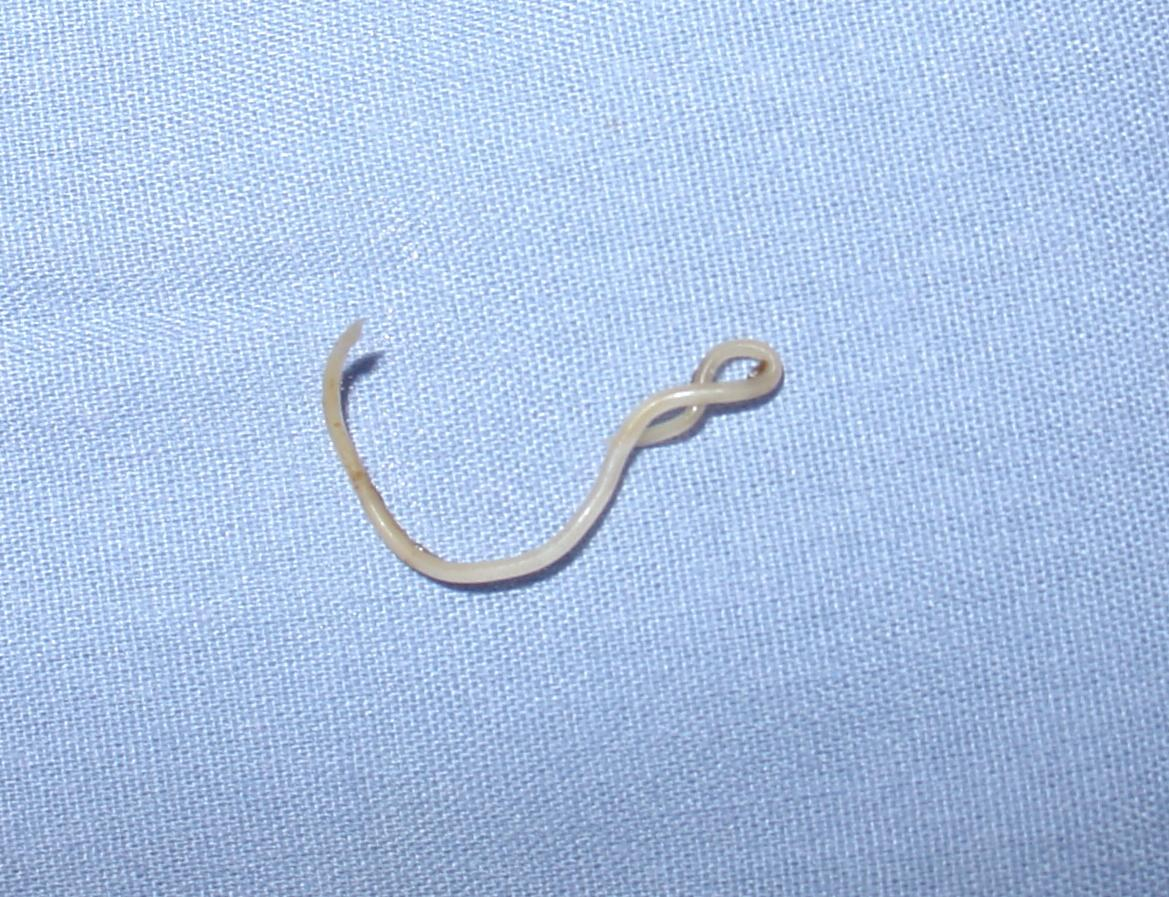
- Adult worms of the dog roundworm (Toxocara canis) live in the gut of dogs, foxes and other canids

Scientific classification
- Kingdom: Animalia
- Phylum: Nematoda
- Class: Chromadorea
- Order: Rhabditida
- Family: Toxocaridae
- Genus: Toxocara
- Species: T. canis

Binomial name
- Toxocara canis (Werner, 1782)

= Toxocara canis =

Species of roundworm

Toxocara canis (T. canis, also known as dog roundworm) is a worldwide-distributed helminth parasite that primarily infects dogs and other canids, but can also infect other animals including humans. The name is derived from the Greek word toxon 'bow, quiver' and the Latin word caro 'flesh'. T. canis live in the small intestine of the definitive host. This parasite is very common in puppies and somewhat less common in adult dogs. In adult dogs, infection is usually asymptomatic but may be characterized by diarrhea. By contrast, untreated infection with Toxocara canis can be fatal in puppies, causing diarrhea, vomiting, pneumonia, enlarged abdomen, flatulence, poor growth rate, and other complications.

As paratenic hosts, a number of vertebrates, including humans, and some invertebrates can become infected. Humans are infected, like other paratenic hosts, by ingestion of embryonated T. canis eggs. The disease (toxocariasis) caused by migrating T. canis larvae results in two syndromes: visceral larva migrans and ocular larva migrans. Owing to transmission of the infection from the mother to her puppies, preventive anthelmintic treatment of newborn puppies is strongly recommended. Several anthelmintic drugs are effective against adult worms, for example fenbendazole, milbemycin, moxidectin, piperazine, pyrantel, and selamectin.

== Morphology ==
T. canis is dioecious, having morphology distinctly different between the male and female. Male worms measure 4 to 6 cm (1.5" to 2.3"), typically smaller than female worms who measure at 6.5 to 15 cm (2.6" to 5.9"). The male's posterior end is curved ventrally and the tail is bluntly pointed. The male has a single tubular testis. They also have simple spicules, which allow for direct sperm transfer. In the female, the vulva is about one-third the body length from the anterior end. The ovaries are very large and extensive. The uteri contain up to 27 million eggs at a time.

Both males and females have three prominent lips. Each lip has a dentigerous ridge. The lateral hypodermal chords are visible with the naked eye. No gubernaculum is present. In both sexes there are prominent cervical alae. The adult T. canis has a round body with spiky cranial and caudal parts, covered by yellow cuticula. Toxocara canis is gonochoristic. The cranial part of the body contains two lateral alae (length 2 to 3.5 mm, width 0.1 mm). The eggs are brownish and almost spherical.T. canis eggs have oval or spherical shapes with granulated surfaces, are thick-walled, and measure from 72 to 85 μm. The eggs are very resistant to various weather and chemical conditions typically found in soil.

== Life cycle ==
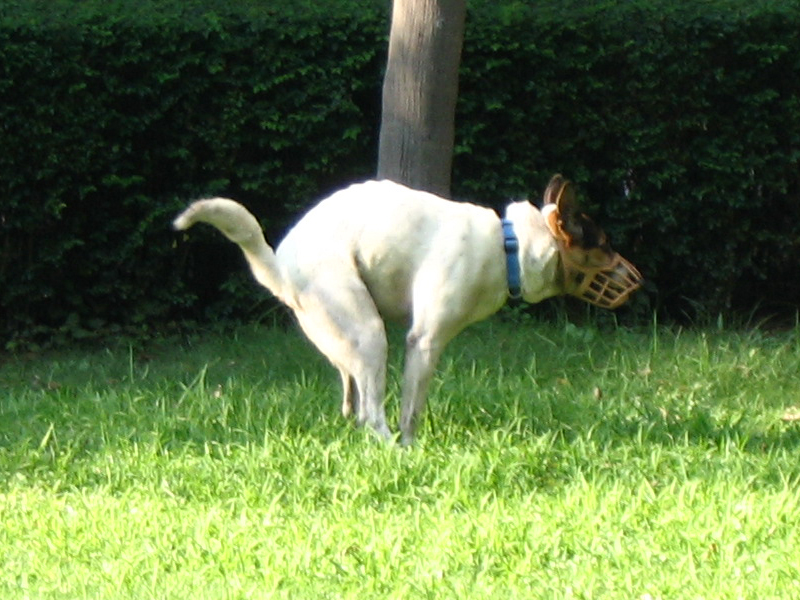
The eggs of T. canis are shed in the scat of an infected dog or puppy; environmental contamination with the eggs is considered the main source of human toxocariasis

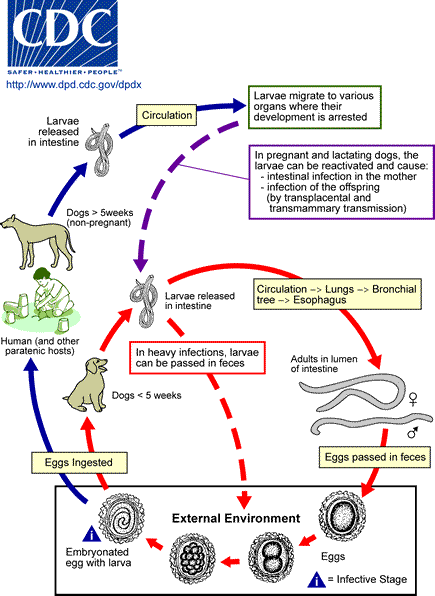
Life cycle (Toxocara canis)

Eggs are deposited in feces of dogs, becoming infectious after 2–4 weeks. Dogs ingest infectious eggs, allowing the eggs to hatch and the larval form of the parasite to penetrate through the gut wall. In dogs under 3 months of age, the larvae hatch in the small intestine, get into the bloodstream, migrate through the liver, and enter the lungs. Once in the lungs, the larvae crawl up the trachea. The larvae are then coughed up and swallowed, leading back down to the small intestine, where they mature to adulthood. This process is called tracheal migration. In dogs older than 3 months of age, the larvae hatch in the small intestine and enter the bloodstream, where they are carried to somatic sites throughout the body (muscles, kidney, mammary glands, etc.) where they become encysted second stage larvae. This process is called somatic migration. At the height of pregnancy, the encysted eggs in an infected female dog will migrate from the mother to the developing fetus, where they will reside in the liver. After parturition, the larvae migrate from the pup's liver to the lungs to undergo tracheal migration. Alternatively, the migrating larvae in the mother may encyst within the mammary glands, becoming active during lactation and passing directly to the nursing puppy via the milk. Larvae transmitted in this manner do not migrate once they are within the small intestine of the puppy; they will develop directly into the adult stage in the small intestine. Once infected, a female dog will usually harbor sufficient larvae to subsequently infect all of her litters, even if she never again encounters an infection. A certain amount of the female dog's dormant larvae penetrate into the intestinal lumen, where molting into adulthood takes place again, thus leading to a new release of eggs containing L_{1} larvae.

Another possible route of infection is the ingestion of paratenic hosts that contain encysted larvae from egg consumption, allowing the parasite to escape from the paratenic host and grow to adulthood within the small intestine of its definitive host, the dog.

Four modes of infection are associated with this species. These modes of infection include direct transmission, prenatal transmission, paratenic transmission, and transmammary transmission.

Transmammary transmission occurs when the suckling pup becomes infected by the presence of L_{3} larvae in the milk during the first three weeks of lactation. There is no migration in the pup via this route.

L_{2} larvae may also be ingested by a variety of animals like mice or rabbits, where they stay in a dormant stage inside the animals' tissue until the intermediate host has been eaten by a dog, where subsequent development is confined to the gastrointestinal tract.

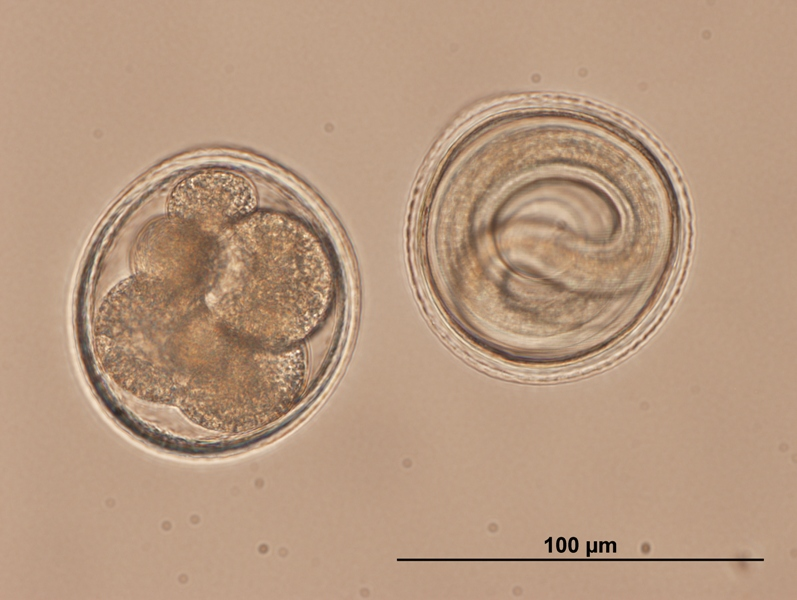
Toxocara eggs- the surface contour is pitted due to the mammilation of the protein layer of the shell, and because of this the eggs are murky

== Transmission to humans ==
Humans can be infected by T. canis, resulting in a condition called toxocariasis. Consumption of eggs from feces-contaminated items is the most common method of infection for humans, especially in children and young adults under the age of 20 years. Although rare, being in close contact with an infected animal (e.g., stroking the fur of an infected animal) or with soil that contains infectious eggs can also cause human infection, especially handling soil with an open wound or accidentally swallowing contaminated soil, as well as eating undercooked or raw meat of an intermediate host of the parasite such as lamb or rabbit. Although the risk of being infected by petting a dog is extremely limited, a single infected puppy can produce more than 100,000 roundworm eggs per gram of feces.

Toxocariasis can result in complications such as hepatomegaly, myocarditis, respiratory failure and vision problems, depending on where the larvae are deposited in the body. In humans, this parasite can infect organs including the lungs, liver, and the back of the eye (which can result in blindness).

== Treatment ==
Humans suffering from visceral infection of T. canis, the drugs albendazole, mebendazole and thiabendazole are highly effective. For other treatments, refer to the disease pages: visceralis larva migrans and ocularis larva migrans.

Anthelminthic drugs are used to treat infections in dogs and puppies for adult worms. Treatment protocol will vary based on the dog's age, production level and activity level. There are different treatment paths for puppies, pregnant bitches, lactating bitches, dogs with increased risk of infection, professional dogs, and dogs sharing homes with young children or immunocompromised individuals.

Puppies: from the age of two weeks, then every 14 days up to two weeks after weaning with fenbendazole/febantel, flubendazole, pyrantel, or nitroscanate, followed by monthly treatments for up to six months of age.

Pregnant bitches: to prevent transmission to the puppies, pregnant females can be given macrocyclic lactones on the 40th and 55th day of pregnancy or genbendazole daily from the 40th day of pregnancy continuing until the 14th day postpartum.

Lactating bitches: should be treated concurrently with the first treatment of puppies.

Dogs with increased risk of infection: i.e. those used in sports, competitions, shows, or those kept in kennels can be given two treatments 4 weeks before and 2–4 weeks after the event.

Professional dogs: i.e. therapy, rescue, or police dogs: 12 times a year, if excretion of worm eggs is to be excluded.

Dogs sharing homes with young children or immunocompromised individuals: 12 times a year, if excretion of worm eggs is to be excluded.

== Prevention ==
There are several ways to prevent a T. canis infection in both dogs and humans. Regular deworming by a veterinarian is important to stop canine re-infections, especially if the dog is frequently outdoors. Removing dog feces from the yard using sealed disposable bags will help control the spread of T. canis. Good practices to prevent human infections include: washing hands before eating and after disposing of animal feces, teaching children not to eat soil, and cooking meat to a safe temperature in order to kill potentially infectious eggs.

== Prevalence ==
T. canis is ubiquitous and approximately 5% of adult dogs are infected at any given time.

== See also ==
- List of parasites (human)
- Toxocara cati
- Toxascaris leonina
- Threadworm infections of dogs
