= Visceral larva migrans =

- Specialty: Infectious diseases
- Causes: Nematodes of the genera Toxocara and Baylisascaris

Visceral larva migrans (VLM) is a condition in humans caused by the migratory larvae of certain nematodes, humans being a dead-end host, and was first reported in 1952. Nematodes causing such zoonotic infections are Baylisascaris procyonis, Toxocara canis, Toxocara cati, and Ascaris suum. These nematodes can infect but not mature in humans after migrating through the intestinal wall, travel with the bloodstream to various organs, and cause inflammation and damage. Affected organs can include the liver, heart (causing myocarditis) and the CNS (causing dysfunction, seizures, and coma). A special variant is ocular larva migrans where usually T. canis larvae travel to the eye.

Only a few roundworm eggs are necessary to cause larva migrans in human children or adults. However, visceral larva migrans seems to affect children aged 1–4 more often while ocular larva migrans more frequently affects children aged 7–8. Between 4.6% and 23% of U.S. children have been infected with the dog roundworm egg. This number is much higher in other parts of the world, such as Colombia, where up to 81% of children have been infected.

Cutaneous larva migrans is a condition where nematodes such as Ancylostoma braziliense migrate to the skin.

== Signs and symptoms ==
Fever, enlargement of the liver, leukocytosis, coughing etc.

== Cause ==
A list of causative agents of larva migrans syndromes is not agreed upon and varies with the author.

== See also ==
- Toxocariasis
- Cutaneous larva migrans
