= Deworming =

Use of anthelmintic drugs

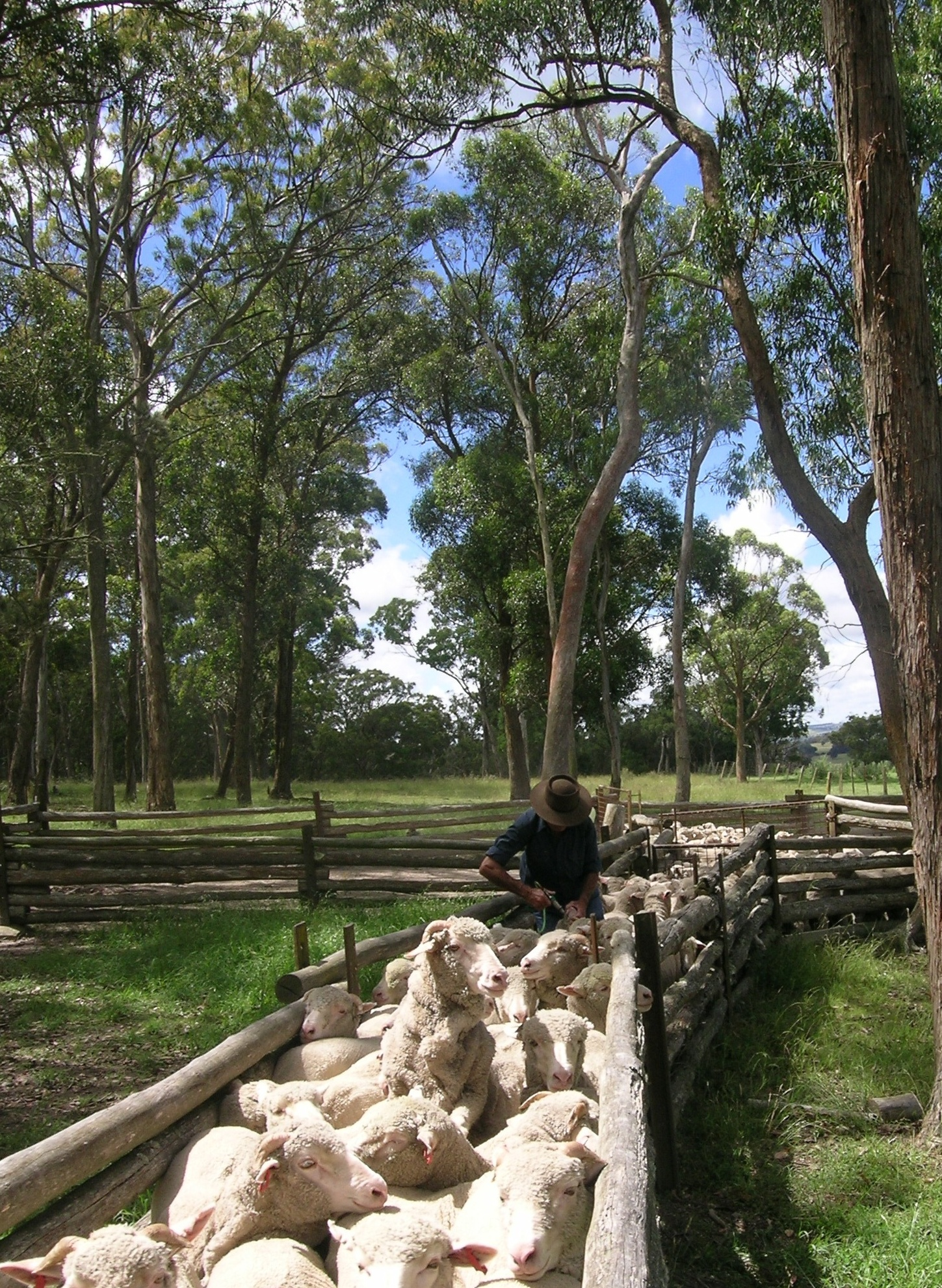
Drenching Merino hoggets, Walcha, NSW

U.S. soldiers treating animals with de-worming medication in Eswatini during VETCAP

Deworming (sometimes known as worming, drenching or dehelmintization) is the giving of an anthelmintic drug (a wormer, dewormer, or drench) to a human or animals to rid them of helminths parasites, such as roundworm, flukes and tapeworm. Purge dewormers for use in livestock can be formulated as a feed supplement that is eaten, a paste or gel that is deposited at the back of the animal's mouth, a liquid drench given orally, an injectable, or as a pour-on which can be applied to the animal's topline. In dogs and cats, purge dewormers come in many forms including a granular form to be added to food, pill form, chew tablets, and liquid suspensions.

== Animals ==
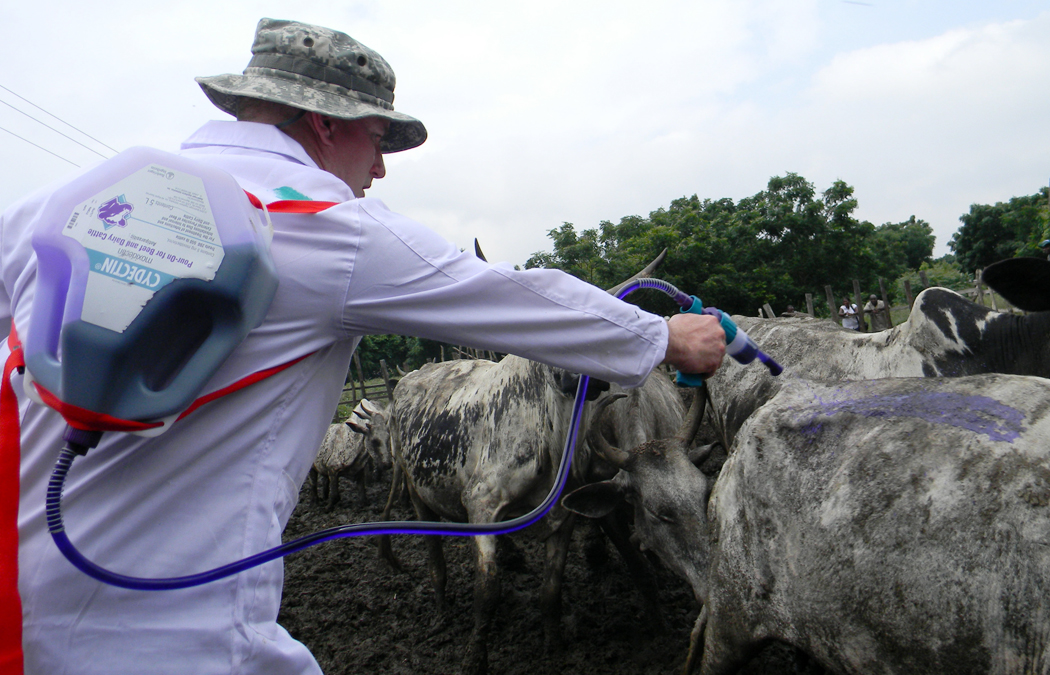
Application of deworming treatment to cattle

=== Large animal ===
Horses are most often dewormed with a paste or gel placed on the back of the animal's mouth via a dosing syringe; feed dewormers are also used, both single-dose varieties and in a daily, "continuous" feed form. Deworming (drenching) a sheep is usually done with a specific drenching gun that squirts an anthelmintic into the sheep's throat. Recently anthelmintic herbal drugs and vaccines have been used against gastrointestinal nematodes due to an increase in resistance to anthelmintic drugs that showed significant potential against parasites in large animals.

==== Anthelmintics ====
Equine Anthelmintics
Drug class	Anthelmintic	Targeted parasite(s)
Macrocyclic lactones	Ivermectin; Moxidectin	Cyathostomes (adult small strongyles); migrating large strongyle larvae; adult large strongyles; ascarids; bots
Benzimidazoles	Fenbendazole; Oxfendazole; Mebendazole	Cyathostomes (adult small strongyles); migrating large strongyle larvae; adult large strongyles; ascarids; bots
Pyrimidines	Pyrantel pamoate; Pyrantel tartrate	Cyathosyomes (adult small strongyles); adult large strongyles; ascarids
Heterocyclics	Piperazine	Cyathosyomes (adult small strongyles); adult large strongyles; ascarids
Pyrazinoisoquinolines	Praziquantel	Tapeworms

=== Small animal ===
The Companion Animal Parasite Council (CAPC) recommends deworming treatments at 2, 4, 6, and 8 weeks of age for puppies and concurrent treatments to the mother. They also recommend deworming treatments at 3, 5, 7, and 9 weeks of age for kittens and the mother. Depending on animal health and lifestyle factors, quarterly treatments may also be recommended.

== Humans ==
Mass deworming campaigns of school children have been used both as a preventive as well as a treatment method for helminthiasis, which includes soil transmitted helminthiasis in children. Children can be treated by administering, for example, mebendazole and albendazole. The cost is relatively low. According to the World Health Organization (WHO), over 870 million children (half of the children in the world) are at risk of parasitic worm infection. Worm infections interfere with nutrient uptake, can lead to anemia, malnourishment and impaired mental and physical development, and pose a serious threat to children's health, education, and productivity. Infected children are often too sick or tired to concentrate at school, or to attend at all.

== See also ==
- Anthelmintic
- Horse care
- Parasitism
