= Ophidascaris robertsi =

Scientific classification
- Kingdom: Animalia
- Phylum: Nematoda
- Class: Chromadorea
- Order: Rhabditida
- Family: Ascarididae
- Genus: Ophidascaris
- Species: O. robertsi

Binomial name
- Ophidascaris robertsi (Sprent & Mines, 1960)

Synonyms
- Amplicaecum robertsi Sprent & Mines, 1960

Species of roundworm

Ophidascaris robertsi is a nematode (also known as roundworm) usually parasitic in the carpet python (Morelia spilota). It is found in Australia and Papua New Guinea. Pythons serve as the typical hosts for Ophidascaris robertsi, which has an indirect life cycle. The adult parasites develop nodular masses in the oesophagus and stomach of carpet pythons and place a small piece of their anterior bodies into the nodules that protrude from the digestive mucosa. When endemic parasites like Ophidascaris robertsi infect local fauna, the pathological changes that follow are frequently self-limiting or do not result in illness.

== Description ==
Identification of Ophidascaris robertsi from closely related species such as Ophidascaris moreliae is noted to be difficult, depending on the morphology of the egg surface, if cervical alae or post-oesophageal caeca are present, and the shape of the lips.

== Hosts ==
Reported infections in pythons include Antaresia childreni (children's python), Aspidites melanocephalus (black-headed python), Aspidites ramsayi (woma python), and Morelia spilota (carpet python). There are also reports of infections in a sugar glider (Petaurus breviceps), a koala (Phascolarctos cinereus), a bandicoot (Perameles nasuta) and in other small to medium-sized marsupial species. One case report of zoonotic infection in a human brain from Australia during 2021–22 was reported in August 2023.

A 2021 study on host loss in parasite species used Ophidascaris robertsi as one of the subject taxa.

== Human infection ==
In June 2022, a neurosurgeon in an Australian hospital found a roundworm in a woman's brain while investigating her mysterious symptoms. The woman initially reported diarrhea and abdominal pain, along with night sweats and dry cough, and was originally diagnosed with a rare lung infection. Though her symptoms improved with treatment, she subsequently returned with symptoms of fever and cough, resulting in an additional diagnosis of a blood disorder.

Worsening symptoms of forgetfulness and depression resulted in an MRI that revealed a brain lesion. The biopsy resulted in the discovery and extraction of the live worm. It was the first known instance of such an occurrence and that type of worm had never been identified as a human parasite. The woman, who lived near carpet python habitat and foraged for native vegetation to cook, was believed to have been exposed by consuming the roundworm's eggs. The eggs are commonly shed in snake droppings due to the snakes' diet of infected animals, and probably contaminated the grass eaten by small mammals. Doctors theorised that the various symptoms experienced by the patient resulted from the migration of the parasitic eggs and larva from the bowel through various other organs before lodging in the brain.
