= Ocular larva migrans =

- Other names: Ocular toxocariasis
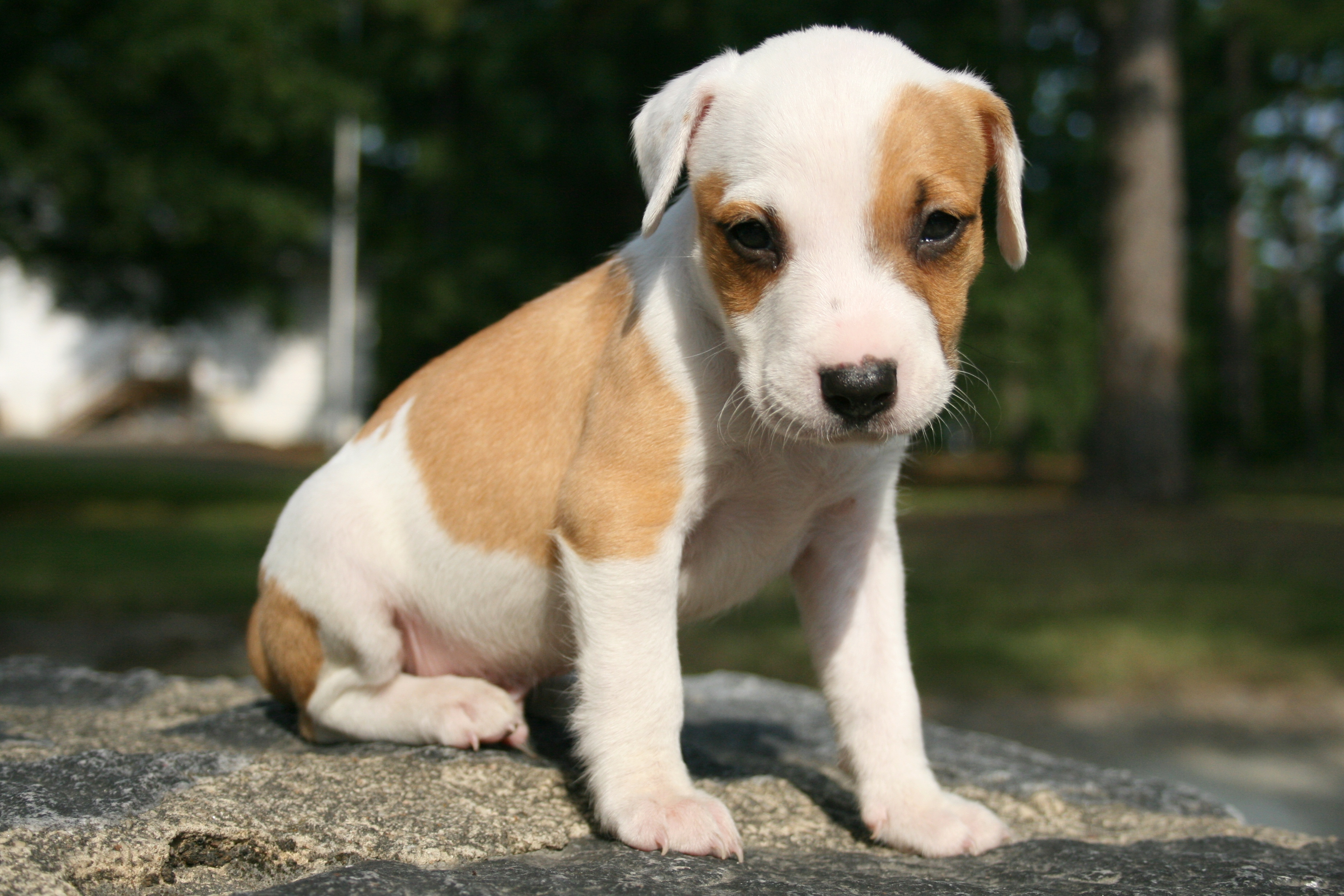
- Puppies are a major source of environmental contamination with Toxocara eggs

Ocular larva migrans (OLM), also known as ocular toxocariasis, is the ocular form of larva migrans syndrome. It occurs when roundworm larvae invade the human eye. OLM infections in humans are caused by the larvae of Toxocara canis (dog roundworm), Toxocara cati (feline roundworm), Ascaris suum (large roundworm of pig), or Baylisascaris procyonis (raccoon roundworm).

They may be associated with visceral larva migrans. Unilateral visual disturbances, strabismus, and eye pain are the most common presenting symptoms.

== Diagnosis ==
The disease presents with an eosinophilic granulomatous mass, most commonly in the posterior pole of the retina. The granulomatous mass develops around the entrapped larva, in an attempt to contain the spread of the larva.

ELISA testing of intraocular fluids has been demonstrated to be of great value in diagnosing ocular toxocariasis.

=== Differential diagnosis ===
The retinal lesion can mimic retinoblastoma in appearance, and mistaken diagnosis of the latter condition can lead to unnecessary enucleation.

== Complications ==
The eye involvement can cause the following inflammatory disorders:

- endophthalmitis
- uveitis
- chorioretinitis

== Epidemiology ==
In contrast to visceral larva migrans, ocular toxocariasis usually develops in older children or young adults with no history of pica. These patients seldom have eosinophilia or visceral manifestations.
