= Toxocara vitulorum =

Scientific classification
- Kingdom: Animalia
- Phylum: Nematoda
- Class: Chromadorea
- Order: Rhabditida
- Family: Toxocaridae
- Genus: Toxocara
- Species: T. vitulorum

Binomial name
- Toxocara vitulorum (Goeze, 1782)

Species of nematode

Toxocara vitulorum is a species of nematode belonging to the family Toxocaridae.

The species has cosmopolitan distribution.
