= Companion Animal Parasite Council =

US non-profit organization

The Companion Animal Parasite Council (CAPC, commonly pronounced "Cap-Cee") is an American non-profit organization (501c3) composed of practicing veterinarians, academic veterinary parasitologists, veterinary technicians, state public health veterinarians, and staff from the Centers for Disease Control and Prevention who are dedicated to reducing the numbers of parasites in dogs and cats along with reducing the risk of transmitting these parasites and diseases to humans.

The group is sponsored mainly by industrial sponsors that are devoted to maintaining the health of pets through improved parasiticides and diagnostics that can be used by practitioners and clients in a safe and consumer-friendly manner.

== Academic Veterinary Parasitologists ==
- Dr. Byron Blagburn, Auburn University
- Dr. Dwight D. Bowman, Cornell University
- Dr. Michael Yabsley, University of Georgia
- Dr. Heather Walden, University of Florida

== Practitioners ==
- Dr. Jay Stewart, Oregon
- Dr. Craig Prior, Tennessee
- Dr. Rick Marrinson, Florida
- Dr. Scott Stevenson, Ontario

== Public Health Veterinarian ==
- Dr. Emilio DeBess, Oregon

== Veterinary Technician ==
- Holly Morss, Washington

== Other Academics ==
- Dr. Robert Lund, Clemson University

== CDC Liaison ==
- Dr. Patricia Wilkins, Georgia

== Executive Director ==
- Dr. Chris Carpenter

Recent publications include a series of articles on a number of diseases that impact both animals and people developed from a workshop composed of members of CAPC along with members of the American Association of Veterinary Parasitologists and the Centers of Disease Control and Prevention. The articles appeared in February 2010 in Trends in Parasitology. This series of articles discusses giardiasis, cryptosporidiosis, toxoplasmosis, toxocariasis, hookworms disease, dirofilariasis (heartworm), baylisascariasis, tick and flea transmitted zoonotic diseases affecting people and animals. Another publication on fleas and ticks that includes authors who are present and past CAPC members is "The Biology, Treatment, and Control of Flea and Tick Infestations."

== Bibliography ==
- Roger W Stich, I. Craig Prior, "Recommendations from the Companion Animal Parasite Council CANINE ARTHROPODS: MITES & TICKS", TODAY’S VETERINARY PRACTICE, March 2015, online.
- Rebecca J. Straub, "Toward the formation of a Companion Animal Parasite Council for the Tropics (CAPCT)", Parasit Vectors. 2015; 8: 271., online
