= Pica (disorder) =

Compulsive eating of non-food items

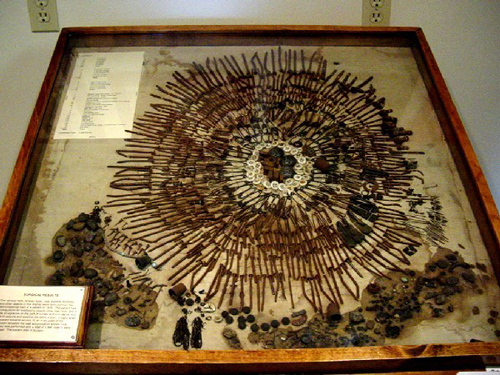
- Stomach contents of a psychiatric patient with pica: 1,446 items, including "457 nails, 42 screws, safety pins, spoon tops, and salt and pepper shaker tops".
- Pronunciation: /ˈpaɪkə/ PY-kə
- Specialty: Psychiatry
- Causes: Iron deficiency; Autism; Culture-bound syndrome; Malnutrition; Schizophrenia

Pica (/ˈpaɪkə/ PY-kə) is the psychologically compulsive craving or consumption of objects that are not normally intended to be consumed. It is classified as an eating disorder but can also be the result of an existing mental disorder. The ingested or craved substance may be biological, natural, or manmade. The term was drawn directly from the Latin word for the Eurasian magpie, a bird subject to much folklore regarding its opportunistic feeding behaviors.

According to the Diagnostic and Statistical Manual of Mental Disorders, 5th edition (DSM-5), pica as a standalone eating disorder must persist for more than one month at an age when eating such objects is considered developmentally inappropriate, not part of culturally sanctioned practice, and sufficiently severe to warrant clinical attention. Pica may lead to intoxication in children, which can result in an impairment of both physical and mental development. In addition, it can cause surgical emergencies due to intestinal obstructions, as well as more subtle symptoms such as nutritional deficiencies, particularly iron deficiency, as well as parasitosis. Pica has been linked to other mental disorders. Stressors such as psychological trauma, maternal deprivation, family issues, parental neglect, pregnancy, and a disorganized family structure are risk factors for pica.

Pica is most commonly seen in pregnant women, small children, and people who may have developmental disorders such as autism. Children eating painted plaster containing lead may develop brain damage from lead poisoning. A similar risk exists from eating soil near roads that existed before the phase-out of tetraethyllead or that were sprayed with oil (to settle dust) contaminated by toxic PCBs or dioxin. In addition to poisoning, a much greater risk exists of gastrointestinal obstruction or tearing in the stomach. Another risk of eating soil is the ingestion of animal feces and accompanying parasites. Cases of severe bacterial infections occurrence (leptospirosis) in patients diagnosed with pica have also been reported. Pica can also be found in animals such as dogs and cats.

== Signs and symptoms ==
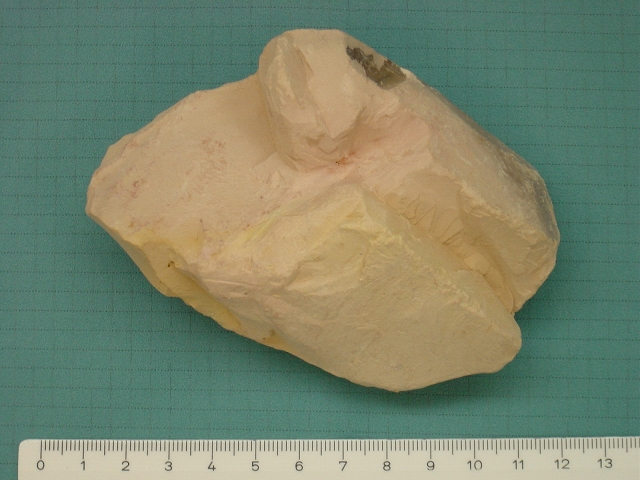
Chalky stone composed of kaolinite with traces of quartz, small pieces of which were sucked on by a person with pica

Pica is the consumption of substances with no nutritional value such as soap, plaster, plastic or paint. Subtypes are characterized by the substance eaten:

- Acuphagia (sharp objects)
- Amylophagia (purified starch, as from corn)
- Cautopyreiophagia (burnt matches)
- Cintaphagia (tape)
- Coniophagia (dust)
- Coprophagia (feces)
- Dermatophagia (skin)
- Emetophagia (vomit)
- Geomelophagia (raw potatoes)
- Geophagia (earth, soil, sand, clay, chalk)
- Hematophagia (vampirism) (blood)
- Hyalophagia (glass)
- Kleptophagia (small objects)
- Lignophagia (wood)
- Lithophagia (stones)
- Metallophagia (metal)
- Mucophagia (mucus)
- Pagophagia (ice)
- Plumbophagia (lead)
- Sapophagia (soap)
- Trichophagia (hair, wool, and other fibers)
- Urophagia (urine)
- Xylophagia (wood or wood products such as paper)

This eating pattern should last at least one month to meet the time diagnostic criteria of pica.

=== Complications ===
Complications may occur due to the substance consumed. For example, lead poisoning may result from the ingestion of paint or paint-soaked plaster, hairballs may cause intestinal obstruction, and Toxoplasma or Toxocara infections may follow ingestion of feces or soil.

== Causes ==
Pica is currently recognized as a mental disorder by the Diagnostic and Statistical Manual of Mental Disorders (DSM-5). According to the DSM-5, mineral deficiencies are occasionally associated with pica, but biological abnormalities are rarely found. People practicing forms of pica, such as geophagy, pagophagy, and amylophagy, are more likely to be anemic or to have low hemoglobin concentration in their blood, lower levels of red blood cells (hematocrit), or lower plasma zinc levels. Specifically, practicing geophagy is more likely to be associated with anemia or low hemoglobin. Practicing pagophagy and amylophagy is more highly associated with anemia.

Mental health conditions such as obsessive–compulsive disorder (OCD) and schizophrenia have been proposed as causes of pica. More recently, cases of pica have been tied to the obsessive–compulsive spectrum, and a move has arisen to consider OCD in the cause of pica. Sensory, physiological, cultural, and psychosocial perspectives have also been used to explain the causation of pica.

Pica may be a cultural practice not associated with a deficiency or disorder. Ingestion of kaolin (white clay) among African American women in the US state of Georgia shows the practice to be a DSM-4 "culture-bound syndrome" and "not selectively associated with other psychopathology". Similar kaolin ingestion is also widespread in parts of Africa. Such practices may stem from purported health benefits, such as the ability of clay to absorb plant toxins and protect against toxic alkaloids and tannic acids.

== Diagnosis ==
No single test confirms pica, but because pica can occur in people who have lower than normal nutrient levels and poor nutrition (malnutrition), the health care provider should test blood levels of iron and zinc. Hemoglobin can also be checked to test for anemia. Lead levels should always be checked in children who may have eaten paint or objects covered in lead-paint dust. The healthcare provider should test and monitor for infection if the person has been eating contaminated soil or animal waste.

=== DSM-5 ===
The DSM-5 posits four criteria that must be met for a person to be diagnosed with pica:

1. Person must have been eating non-nutritive nonfoods for at least one month.
2. This eating must be considered abnormal for the person's stage of development.
3. Eating these substances cannot be associated with a cultural practice that is considered normal in the social context of the individual.
4. For people who currently have a medical condition (e.g.: pregnancy) or a mental disorder (e.g.: autism spectrum), the action of eating non-nutritive nonfoods should only be considered pica if it is dangerous and requires extra medical investigation or treatment on top of what they are already receiving for their pre-existing condition.

=== Differential diagnosis ===
In individuals with autism, schizophrenia, and certain physical disorders (such as Kleine–Levin syndrome), non-nutritive substances may be eaten. In such instances, pica should only be noted as an additional diagnosis if the eating behaviour is sufficiently persistent and severe to warrant additional clinical attention.

== Treatment ==
Both psychotherapeutic and pharmacological interventions for pica have been criticized for low evidence quality. It is recommended that treatment options for pica vary by patient and suspected causes. Pica may often fade on its own when in pregnant women or children, though treatment and routine evaluation are advised due to potentially serious consequences.

Due to its impact on physical health, pica may require a vast assortment of experts to be managed, and it is recommended that physical health conditions be addressed prior to treatment. An initial approach often involves screening for, and if necessary, treating any mineral deficiencies or other comorbid conditions. From there, treatment may primarily involve decreasing access to the craved substance or providing a supplement, especially for at-risk patients (e.g. pregnant women). Iron deficiencies or other nutrient deficiencies should be treated using dietary supplements and through dietary changes.

Certain psychotherapeutic approaches have been found helpful for pica. Behavior-based treatment options can be useful for people who have a developmental disability or mental illness. These treatments may involve teaching strategies to help patients alter their responses to certain stimuli. Behavioral treatments have been shown to reduce pica severity by 80% in people with intellectual disabilities. Aversion therapy is another option, wherein the person learns through positive reinforcement and mild aversions which foods are good and which ones they should not eat. Differential reinforcement is also commonly used to block pica responses by redirecting focus to other activities.

Use of medication in pica treatment is generally scarce when not aimed at treating underlying conditions, as no existing pharmacological intervention is specifically tailored towards pica. Antipsychotic medication is recommended in certain instances, though is generally cautioned against due to side-effects and the anecdotal nature of evidence. SSRIs have been successfully used for pica associated with OCD. A case-report found that asenapine resulted in significant improvement on a woman with several mental health conditions after bariatric surgery, whereas another found use in venlafaxine for pica associated with depression. Reports prior to these publications have cautioned against the use of medication until all non-psychogenic causes have been ruled out.

== Epidemiology ==
The prevalence of pica is difficult to establish because of differences in definition and the reluctance of patients to admit to abnormal cravings and ingestion, thus leading to the prevalence recordings of pica among at-risk groups being in the range of 8% to 65% depending on the study. Based on compiled self-report and interview data of pregnant and postpartum women, pica is most prevalent geographically in Africa, with an estimated prevalence of 44.8%, followed by North and South America (23.0%) and Eurasia (17.5%). Factors associated with Pica in this population were determined to be anemia and low levels of education, both of which are associated with low socioeconomic backgrounds. Two studies of adults with intellectual disabilities living in institutions found that 21.8% and 25.8% of these groups had pica.

Prevalence rates for children are unknown. Young children commonly place non-nutritious material into their mouths. This activity occurs in 75% of 12-month-old infants, and 15% of two- to three-year-old children.

In institutionalized children with mental disabilities, pica occurs in 10–33%.

== History ==
The condition currently known as pica was first described by Hippocrates.

The term pica originates in the Latin word for magpie, pīca, a bird famed for its unusual eating behaviors and believed to eat almost anything. The Latin may have been a translation of a Greek word meaning both 'magpie, jay' and 'pregnancy craving, craving for strange food'. In 13th-century Latin work, pica was referenced by the Greeks and Romans; however, it was not addressed in medical texts until 1563.

In the southern United States in the 1800s, geophagia was a common practice among the enslaved population. Geophagia is a form of pica in which the person consumes earthly substances such as clay, and is particularly prevalent to augment a mineral-deficient diet. Kaolin was consumed by enslaved people from West African in the Southeastern United States, particularly the Georgia belt, due to the antidiarrheal qualities in the treatment of dysentery and other abdominal ailments. The practice of consuming kaolin rocks was thereafter studied scientifically, the results of which led to the subsequent pharmaceutical commercialization of kaolinite, the clay mineral contained in kaolin. Kaolinite became the active ingredient in antidiarrheal drugs such as Kaopectate, although it was replaced by attapulgite in the 1980s and by bismuth subsalicylate starting in 2004.

Research on eating disorders from the 16th to the 20th centuries suggests that during that time in history, pica was regarded more as a symptom of other disorders rather than its own specific disorder. Even today, what could be classified as pica behavior is a normative practice in some cultures as part of their beliefs, healing methods, or religious ceremonies.

Prior to the elimination of the category of "feeding disorders in infancy and early childhood", which is where pica was classified, from the DSM-5, pica was primarily diagnosed in children. However, since the removal of the category, psychiatrists have started to diagnose pica in people of all ages.

The Glore Psychiatric Museum in Saint Joseph, Missouri has a 1910 exhibit with "an imaginative starburst arrangement of 1,446 buttons, screws, bolts, and nails that were eaten by a patient who died unexpectedly. They were only discovered during her autopsy."

== Animals ==
Unlike in humans, pica in dogs or cats may be a sign of immune-mediated hemolytic anemia, especially when it involves eating substances such as tile grout, concrete dust, and sand. Dogs exhibiting this form of pica should be tested for anemia with a complete blood count or at least hematocrit levels. Although several hypotheses have been proposed by experts to explain pica in animals, insufficient evidence exists to prove or disprove any of them. In addition to domestic cases, animal studies have helped scientists better understand pica and other disordered eating patterns. Animal Models of Eating Disorders highlights that eating disorders are often caused by a mix of environmental, genetic, and social factors, and studying animals can help isolate these causes. For example, researchers can separate abnormal eating patterns from changes in body weight to see how eating behavior alone affects health and brain function.

Experimental studies have also explored treatment responses. One study found that pica-like behavior in rats caused by chemotherapy drugs was reduced after specific vagotomies, showing a biological connection between the brain, stomach, and eating behavior. These findings help explain how pica and related eating behaviors can be both physical and psychological.

== Cultural and real-life perspectives ==
Cultural research continues to show that pica is not only medical but also social. For example, a study in North-Central Nigeria found that pica among women is often shaped by cultural beliefs and community practices, rather than just psychological or nutritional causes. Real-life cases, such as a 10-year-old boy who felt a strong, uncontrollable urge to eat fibers and described relief after doing so, demonstrate how pica can overlap with obsessive-compulsive behaviors.

== See also ==
- Animal psychopathology § Pica
- Jacques de Falaise
- Michel Lotito, Frenchman known for his ability to eat and digest metal, nicknamed Monsieur Mangetout ('Mr. Eat-All')
- Swallow, a 2019 film about a young woman who, emotionally stifled in her marriage and domestic life, develops an impulse to consume inedible objects.
- Shoenice, YouTuber who films videos of himself eating non-food items
