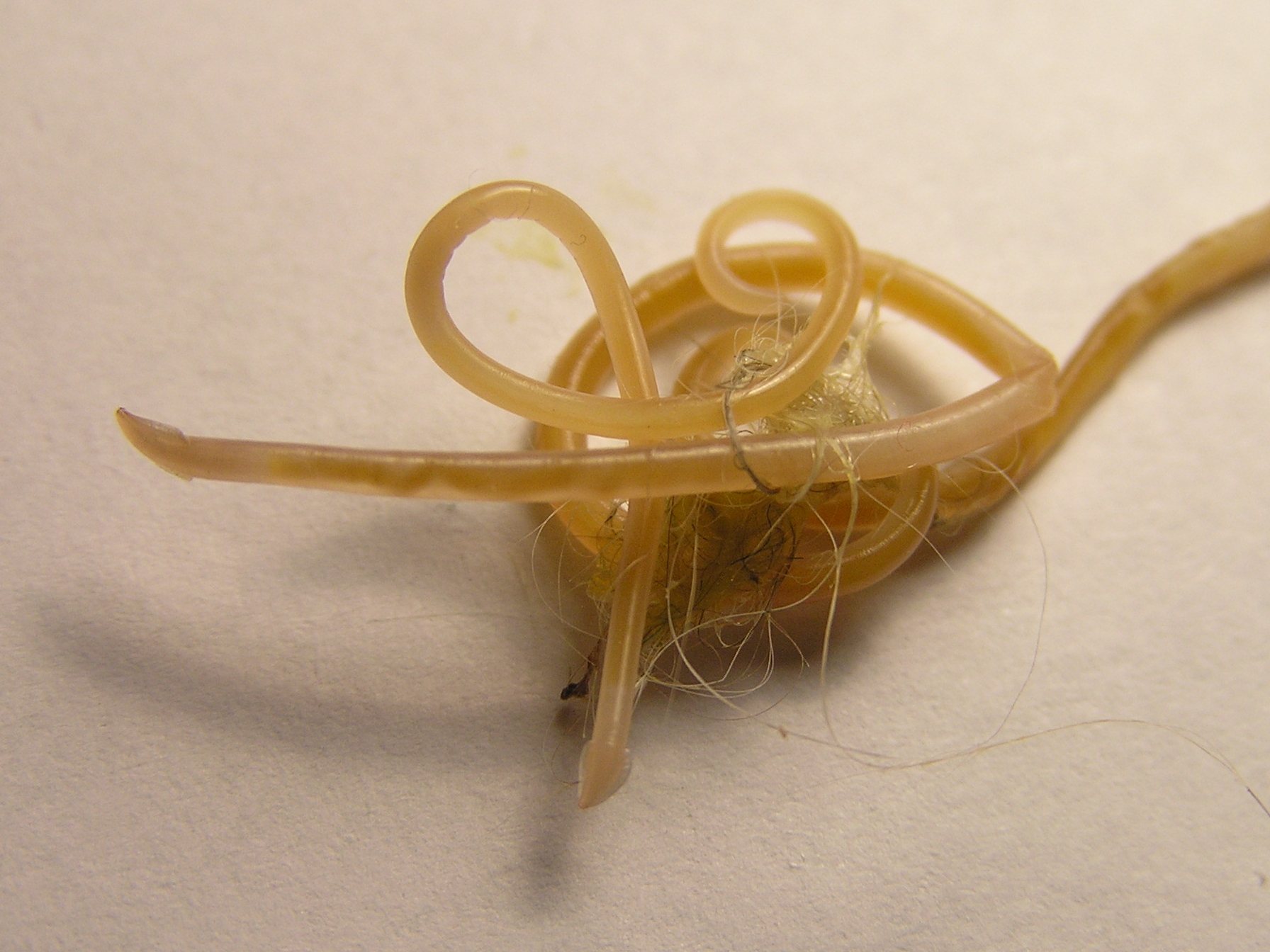
- Cluster of adult worms

Scientific classification
- Kingdom: Animalia
- Phylum: Nematoda
- Class: Chromadorea
- Order: Rhabditida
- Family: Toxocaridae
- Genus: Toxocara
- Species: T. cati

Binomial name
- Toxocara cati Schrank, 1788

Synonyms
- Toxocara mystax (Zeder, 1800)

= Toxocara cati =

Species of worm

Toxocara cati, also known as the feline roundworm, is a parasite of cats and other felids. It is one of the most common nematodes of cats, infecting both wild and domestic felids worldwide. Adult worms are localised in the gut of the host. In adult cats, the infection – which is called toxocariasis – is usually asymptomatic. However, massive infection in juvenile cats can be fatal.

Feline roundworms are brownish-yellow to cream-colored to pink and may be up to 10 cm in length. Adults have short, wide cervical alae giving their anterior ends the distinct appearance of an arrow (hence their name, toxo, meaning arrow, and cara, meaning head). Eggs are pitted ovals with a width of 65 μm and a length of about 75 μm making them invisible to the human eye. The larvae are so small that they are easily transmitted from an adult female to her nursing kittens through her milk.

== Transmission ==
Wild felids can become infected from a variety of sources; the primary source is infected fecal matter. The eggs of the roundworm become infective in three to four weeks after being passed out in fecal matter. Contact with the soil, licking fur near feet, and eating a host animal (such as rodents) can also lead to infection of the felines. The consumption of infected carrion also leads to contraction of the parasites, which is some of the food that members of Felidae consume. The eggs hatch in the intestines and the larvae are then released into the cat's digestive tract. The larvae are capable of migrating through the tissues and are found in the liver, lungs, tracheal washings and muscles as well as in the digestive tract. From there, they move up to the trachea where they are swallowed, causing hacking and other problems. The larvae can also move throughout the body and cause more damage to the infected individuals. The worms can even go into the mother's milk and infect the young.

== Clinical signs ==
There are numerous clinical signs when dealing with feline roundworm. Some clinical signs that can be detected easily are vomiting, decreased appetite, and poor growth. Like many diseases, changes in behavior can also be attributed to toxocariasis. Decreased appetite will result in a scrawny, mangy, and sickly appearance. Toxocariasis is exceptionally detrimental to kittens, as appetite loss and poor growth can ultimately lead to mortality. Additional clinical signs that can be identified include a pot bellied appearance, abdominal discomfort, and diarrhea. Those with a small worm burden, however, may not show the clinical signs of being infected with worms, and not receive treatment.

== Treatment ==
Treatment for Toxocara cati infections in cats is rather simple. There are a number of anthelmintics that will kill the adult worms, including Ivermectin, emodepside, fenbendazole, milbemycin, and moxidectin. However, most drugs are ineffective against the immature parasites. Consequently, infected cats will usually need multiple doses administered in two or three week intervals in order to fully eradicate the worms.

== T. cati infection in humans ==
It is possible for Toxocara cati to be transmitted to humans, usually as a consequence of humans consuming the larval stage of the parasite, resulting in a condition known as toxocariasis. Typically, this happens when an individual pets an infected cat, picks up the parasite off of the fur and touches their face before washing their hands. The larvae migrate through the viscera in humans. Depending on the location and number of the larva in the human host, the disease can either be asymptomatic or cause conditions such as fever, cough, pneumonia, and vision loss.

The two more severe forms of the disease are visceral toxocariasis and ocular toxocariasis. Visceral toxocariasis typically occurs in children, but can infect persons of any age. Signs and symptoms can include fever, wheezing, hepatomegaly, abdominal pain, anorexia, or skin reaction. Rarely, the migrating larvae can cause eosinophilic meningitis or encephalitis, myelitis, optic neuritis, radiculitis, cranial nerve palsy, or myocarditis. In lab findings, there is almost always a marked peripheral eosinophilia and often, anemia and a hypergammaglobulinemia.

Ocular toxocariasis typically occurs in 5 to 10-year-olds resulting in significant damage to the eye. Usually only one eye is affected, and manifestations can include strabismus, decreased vision, and leukocoria. Eye exam may show a subretinal granulomatous mass or posterior pole granuloma. Even in relatively healthy people, the roundworm larvae infect organs such as the liver, lungs, eyes or brain and cause severe symptoms, such as:

- a high temperature
- coughing or wheezing
- stomach ache
- an itchy rash
- eye pain or redness
- changes to sight such as floaters or flashes of light
- loss of vision (usually in one eye)

== See also ==
- List of parasites of humans
- Feline zoonosis
- Toxoplasmosis
