= Kinonchulus =

Scientific classification
- Domain: Eukaryota
- Kingdom: Animalia
- Phylum: Nematoda
- Class: Adenophorea
- Order: Trefusiida
- Family: Onchulidae
- Genus: Kinonchulus; Riemann 1972

Synonyms
- Pseudonchulus

Genus of roundworms

Kinonchulus is a genus of nematode, one of the few to retain its pharyngeal armature to adulthood.
