= Onchulidae =

Scientific classification
- Domain: Eukaryota
- Kingdom: Animalia
- Phylum: Nematoda
- Class: Adenophorea
- Order: Trefusiida
- Family: Onchulidae

Family of roundworms

Onchulidae is a family of nematodes belonging to the order Enoplida.

Genera:

- Caprionchulus Swart & Heyns, 1993
- Cupostomella Siddiqi, 2013
- Euronchulus Siddiqi, 2013
- Holovachovius Siddiqi, 2013
- Kinonchulus Riemann, 1972
- Tobrilonchulus Holovachov, Winiszewska, Sturhan, Esquivel & Wu, 2008
