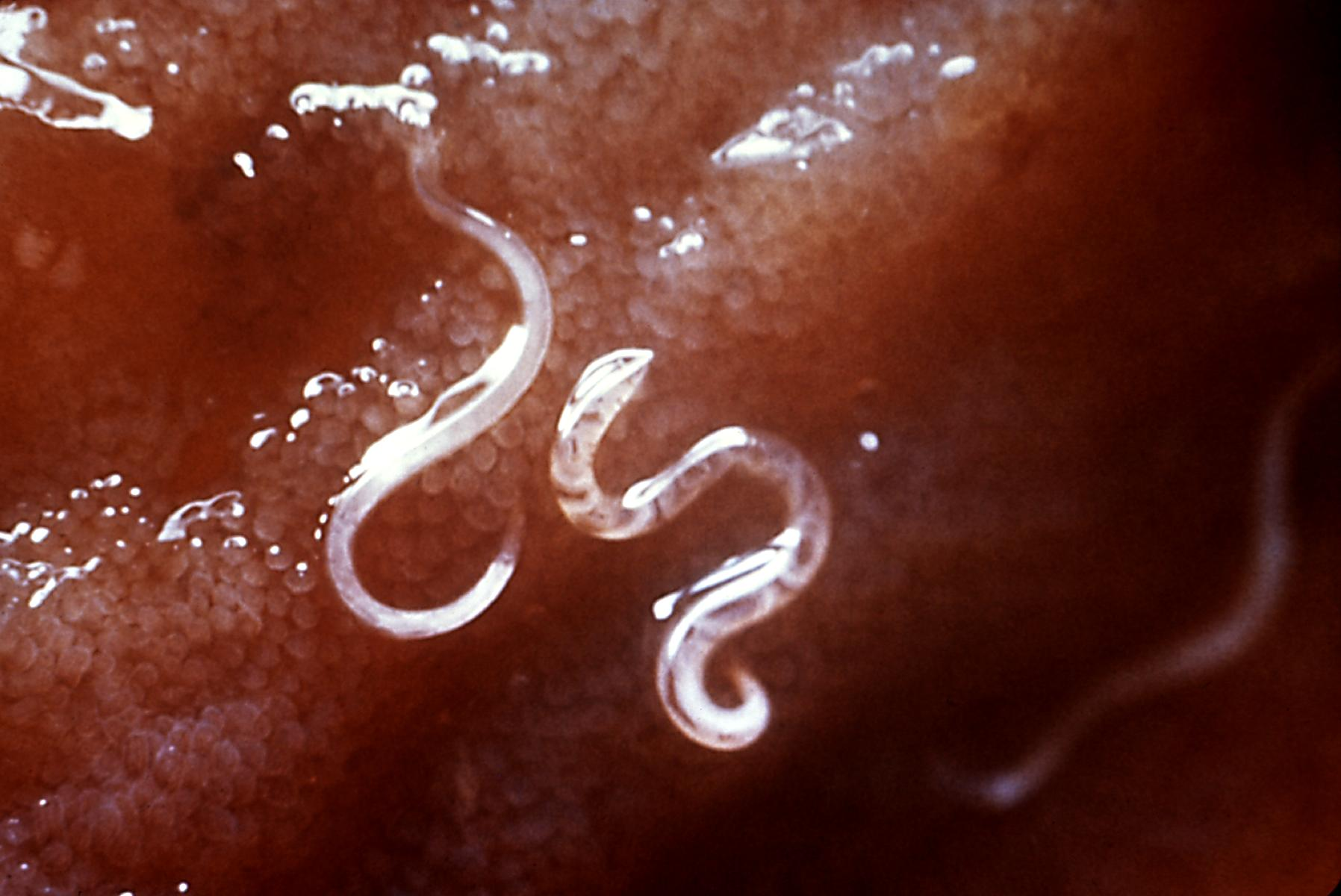
- Ancylostoma caninum hookworms (Strongylida: Ancylostomidae)

Scientific classification
- Kingdom: Animalia
- Phylum: Nematoda
- Class: Chromadorea
- Subclass: Rhabditia

Orders
- Rhabditida; Strongylida and see text

Synonyms
- Rhabditina

= Rhabditia =

Subclass of roundworms

Subclass Rhabditia is mostly composed of parasitic nematodes (particularly in the Strongylida), though there are some free-living species as well (particularly in the Rhabditida). Phasmids (posterior sensory structures) are well-developed, while amphids (anterior sensory structures) are poorly developed or absent in this group.

In an alternate classification system, they are treated as suborder Rhabditina, with the orders listed here being ranked as infraorders. Also, the Diplogasterida, which are sometimes considered a monotypic subclass, are probably better placed in the Rhabditia. On the other hand, the old placement of the Ascaridida in Rhabditia instead of Spiruria seems unwarranted. The Rhabditida contain a number of families which are probably better placed in the Tylenchia; alternatively, the latter group may entirely be merged with the Rhabditia.

== See also ==
- Skrjabinema
