= Syphacia oryzomyos =

Scientific classification
- Domain: Eukaryota
- Kingdom: Animalia
- Phylum: Nematoda
- Class: Chromadorea
- Order: Rhabditida
- Family: Oxyuridae
- Genus: Syphacia
- Species: S. oryzomyos

Binomial name
- Syphacia oryzomyos Quentin and Kinsella, 1972

Species of roundworm

Syphacia oryzomyos is a nematode that infects the marsh rice rat (Oryzomys palustris) in Florida. A similar species of Syphacia has been recorded from the rice rats Oligoryzomys fulvescens and Handleyomys melanotis in San Luis Potosí, but because only females were found, this worm could not be identified to species.

== See also ==
- List of parasites of the marsh rice rat

== Literature cited ==
- Kinsella, J.M. 1988. Comparison of helminths of rice rats, Oryzomys palustris, from freshwater and saltwater marshes in Florida. Proceedings of the Helminthological Society of Washington 55(2):275–280.
- Underwood, H.T., Owen, J.G. and Engstrom, M.D. 1986. Endohelminths of three species of Oryzomys (Rodentia: Cricetidae) from San Luis Potosi, Mexico (subscription required). The Southwestern Naturalist 31(3):410–411.
