= Pruritus of genital organs =

Pruritus of genital organs may refer to:

- Pruritus scroti
- Pruritus vulvae
