= Skrjabinema ovis =

Scientific classification
- Domain: Eukaryota
- Kingdom: Animalia
- Phylum: Nematoda
- Class: Chromadorea
- Order: Rhabditida
- Family: Oxyuridae
- Genus: Skrjabinema
- Species: S. ovis

Binomial name
- Skrjabinema ovis (Skrjabin, 1915)

Species of roundworm

Skrjabinema ovis is a nematode species of the genus Skrjabinema within the Oxyuridae family. This species typically parasitise ruminants. Skrjabinema ovis is known to invade the intestinal tract of the Guanaco, Lama guanacoe, after ingestion of eggs of this worm.
