= Enterobius gregorii =

Scientific classification
- Kingdom: Animalia
- Phylum: Nematoda
- Class: Chromadorea
- Order: Rhabditida
- Family: Oxyuridae
- Genus: Enterobius
- Species: E. gregorii

Binomial name
- Enterobius gregorii Hugot, 1983

Species of parasitic roundworm

Enterobius gregorii is a parasitic roundworm.

In 1983 Jean-Pierre Hugot declared his isolation of a new human parasite. While examining Oxyuridae of Malagasy lemurs and in Old World monkeys, he concluded that what had been previously assumed to be a single species of parasite was in fact couples of sister-species. Says Hugot, "In the Human parasites, which are very closely related to those of the Old World Monkeys, two types of spicules were described and we consider that each type belongs to a different species: Enterobius vermicularis (L., 1758) for the larger spicule (100 to 122 micrometers), and Enterobius gregorii n. sp. for the shorter spicule (70 to 80 micrometers)".
Enterobius gregorii could also be only an early stage of Enterobius vermicularis.
