= Pinworm =

- Pinworm may refer to:
- Enterobius, a genus of parasitic worms
  - Enterobius vermicularis, the primary Enterobius species infecting humans
    - Pinworm infection, the condition caused by Enterobius vermicularis
- Strongyloides stercoralis, a species of parasitic worm
