= Syphacia =

Scientific classification
- Kingdom: Animalia
- Phylum: Nematoda
- Class: Chromadorea
- Order: Rhabditida
- Family: Oxyuridae
- Genus: Syphacia; Seurat, 1916

Genus of roundworms

Syphacia is a genus of nematodes belonging to the family Oxyuridae.

The genus has cosmopolitan distribution.

Species:

- Syphacia agraria Sharpilo, 1973
- Syphacia arvicolae Sharpilo, 1973
- Syphacia carlitosi Robles & Navone, 2007
- Syphacia dewiae Smales, 2020
- Syphacia emileromani
- Syphacia evaginata Hugot & Quentin, 1985
- Syphacia frederici Roman, 1945
- Syphacia hodarae Rojas Herrera, Notarnicola, Mino & Robles, 2011
- Syphacia kinsellai Robles & Navone, 2007
- Syphacia kumis Dewi, Hasegawa & Asakawa, 2014
- Syphacia montana Yamaguti, 1943
- Syphacia muris (Yamaguti, 1935)
- Syphacia nigeriana Baylis, 1928
- Syphacia niobe
- Syphacia obvelata (Rudolphi, 1802)
- Syphacia ohtaorum
- Syphacia oryzomyos Quentin & Kinsella, 1972
- Syphacia peromysci
- Syphacia petrusewiczi Bernard, 1966
- Syphacia ratti Roman, 1946
- Syphacia stroma (von Linstow, 1884)
- Syphacia thompsoni Price, 1928
- Syphacia vanderbrueli Bernard, 1966
- Syphacia venteli Travassos, 1937
