= Citellina =

Scientific classification
- Domain: Eukaryota
- Kingdom: Animalia
- Phylum: Nematoda
- Class: Chromadorea
- Order: Rhabditida
- Family: Oxyuridae
- Genus: Citellina; Prendel

Genus of roundworms

Citellina is a genus of nematodes within the Oxyuridae family. Species of this genus typically parasitise marmots and ground squirrels of holarctic distribution. It was initially defined by Prendel in 1928, with the type species Citellina dispar

Citellina triradiata has been recovered from the Spotted Ground Squirrel (Xerospermophilus spilosoma), and Citellina undulata is described from the Long-tailed Ground Squirrel (Urocitellus undulatus).
