= Oxyurinae =

Oxyurinae may refer to:

- Oxyuridae, a family of nematode worms
- Oxyurini, a tribe of ducks in the family Anatidae
