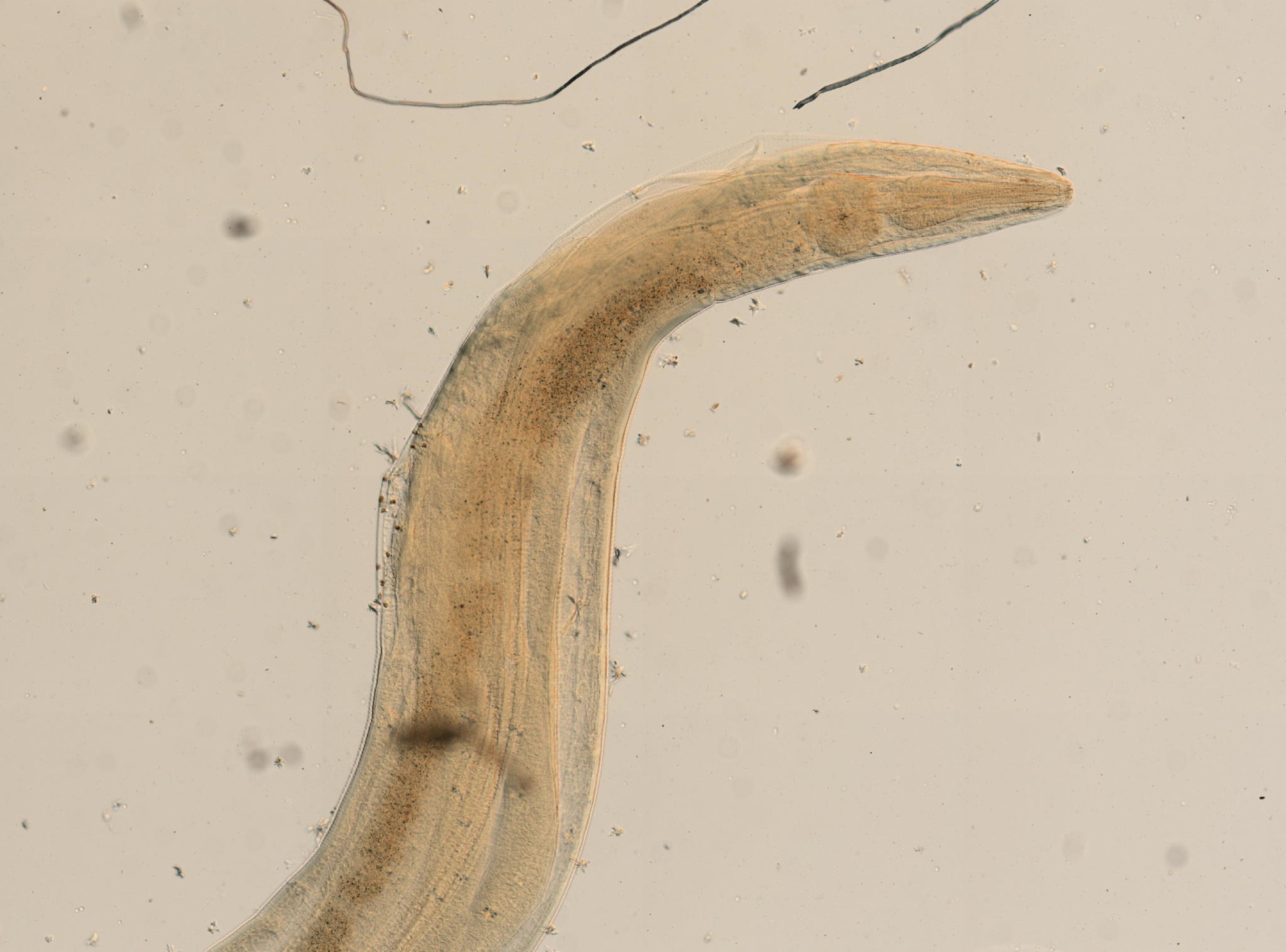
- Passalurus ambiguus

Scientific classification
- Kingdom: Animalia
- Phylum: Nematoda
- Class: Chromadorea
- Order: Rhabditida
- Family: Oxyuridae
- Genus: Passalurus; Dujardin, 1845

= Passalurus =

Genus of roundworms

Passalurus is a genus of nematodes belonging to the family Oxyuridae.

The species of this genus are found in Europe and Northern America.

Species:

- Passalurus ambiguus (Rudolphi, 1819)
- Passalurus nonannulatus Skinker, 1931
