= Oxyuris =

Scientific classification
- Kingdom: Animalia
- Phylum: Nematoda
- Class: Chromadorea
- Order: Rhabditida
- Family: Oxyuridae
- Subfamily: Oxyurinae
- Genus: Oxyuris; Rudolphi, 1803

Synonyms
- Lepturis Schlotthauber, 1860; Oryuris Mudie, 1840; Oxiuris Leuckart, 1835; Oxiurus Sonsino, 1878; Oxyaris Calmette, 1895; Oxyuros Oliveira, 1904

Genus of roundworms

Oxyuris is a genus of nematodes belonging to the family Oxyuridae.

The genus has cosmopolitan distribution.

== Species ==
The genus contains the following species:

- Oxyuris alata Rudolphi, 1819
- Oxyuris armata Kreis, 1940
- Oxyuris curvula Rudolphi, 1803
- Oxyuris equi (Schrank, 1788)
- Oxyuris flagellum Ehrenberg, 1828
- Oxyuris karamoja Baylis, 1929
- Oxyuris megaloon Linstow, 1906
- Oxyuris obvelata Bremser
- Oxyuris paradoxa Molin
- Oxyuris parallela Linstow, 1908
- Oxyuris praeputialis Skrjabin, 1916
- Oxyuris pugio Ehrenberg, 1828
- Oxyuris semilanceolata Molin
- Oxyuris sumatrensis Parona, 1896
- Oxyuris tenuicauda Linstow, 1910
