= Pinworm infection =

- Other names: Enterobiasis, oxyuriasis (Oxyuridae)
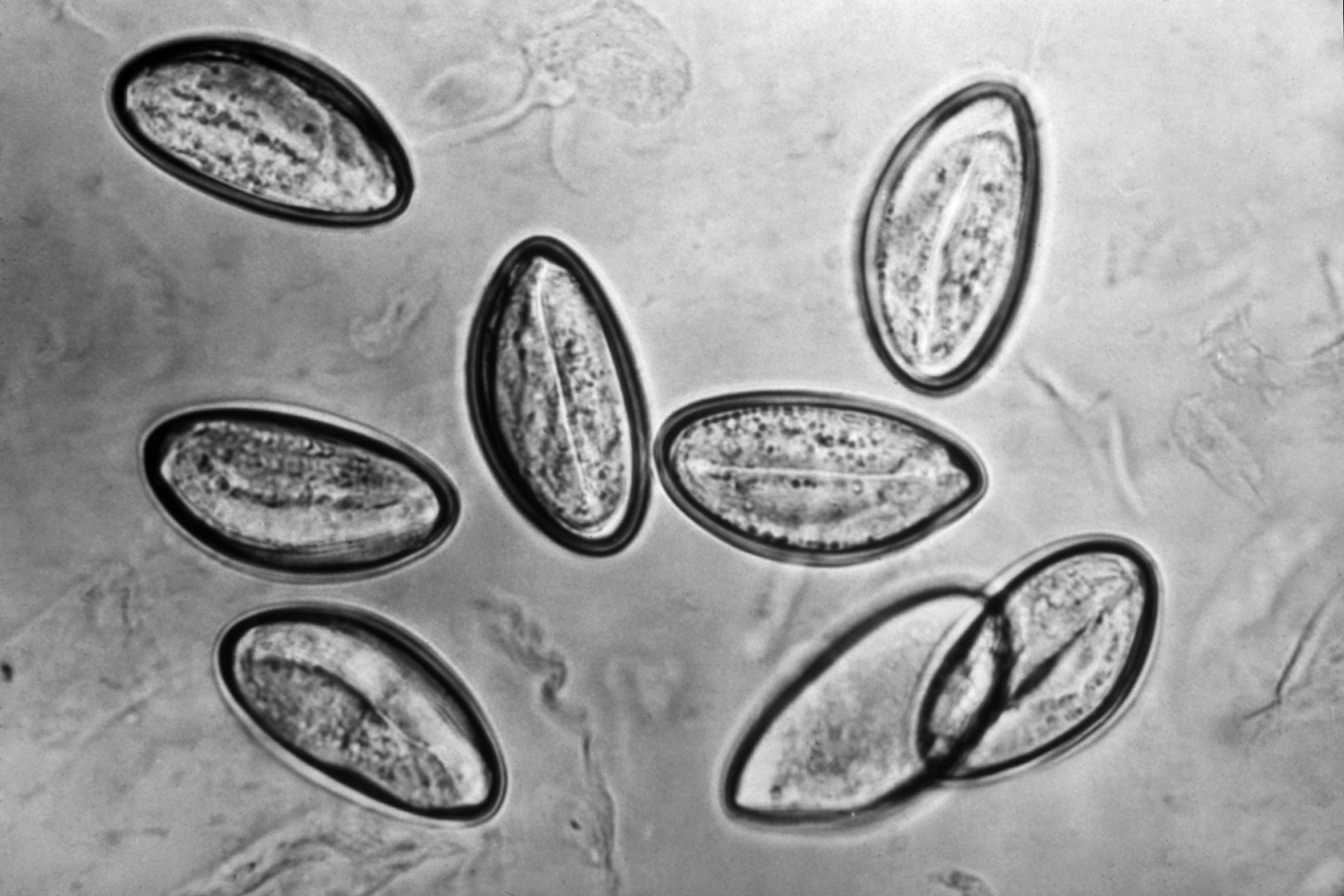
- Pinworm eggs (Enterobius vermicularis)
- Specialty: Pediatrics, Infectious disease
- Symptoms: Itchy anal area
- Usual onset: 4 to 8 weeks from exposure
- Causes: Pinworms (Enterobius vermicularis)
- Risk factors: Attending school and nursery, children
- Diagnostic method: Seeing the worms or eggs
- Prevention: Handwashing, daily bathing in the morning, daily changing of underwear
- Medication: Mebendazole, Flubendazole, pyrantel pamoate, or albendazole
- Prognosis: Non-serious
- Frequency: Common

Pinworm infection (threadworm infection in the UK), also known as enterobiasis, is a human parasitic disease caused by the pinworm, Enterobius vermicularis. The most common symptom is pruritus ani, or itching in the anal area. The period of time from swallowing eggs to the appearance of new eggs around the anus is 4 to 8 weeks. Some people who are infected do not have symptoms.

The disease is spread between people by pinworm eggs. The eggs initially occur around the anus, and can survive for up to three weeks in the environment. They may be swallowed following contamination of the hands, food, or other articles. Those at risk are those who go to school, live in a health care institution or prison, or take care of people who are infected. Other animals do not spread the disease. Diagnosis is by seeing the worms which are about one centimetre long or the eggs under a microscope.

Treatment is typically with two doses of the medications mebendazole, pyrantel pamoate, or albendazole two weeks apart. Everyone who lives with or takes care of an infected person should be treated at the same time. Washing personal items in hot water after each dose of medication is recommended. Good handwashing, daily bathing in the morning, and daily changing of underwear can help prevent reinfection.

Pinworm infections commonly occur in all parts of the world. They are the most common type of worm infection in Western Europe, Northern Europe and the United States. School-aged children are the most commonly infected. In the United States about 20% of children will develop pinworm at some point. Infection rates among high-risk groups may be as high as 50%. It is not considered a serious disease. Pinworms are believed to have affected humans throughout history.

== Signs and symptoms ==
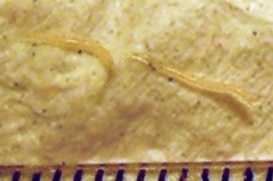
Two female pinworms next to a ruler. The markings are one millimetre apart.

One-third of individuals with pinworm infection are totally asymptomatic. The main symptoms are itching in and around the anus and perineum. The itching occurs mainly during the night, and is caused by the female pinworms migrating to lay eggs around the anus. Both the migrating females and the clumps of eggs are irritating, as well as the sticky substance that is produced by the worms when the eggs are laid. The intensity of the itching varies, and it can be described as tickling, crawling sensations, or even acute pain. The itching leads to continuously scratching the area around the anus, which can further result in tearing of the skin and complications such as secondary bacterial infections, including bacterial skin inflammation, and hair follicle inflammation. General symptoms are trouble sleeping, and restlessness. A considerable proportion of children experience loss of appetite, weight loss, irritability, emotional instability, and bed wetting.

Pinworms cannot damage the skin, and they do not normally migrate through tissues. However, they may move onto the vulva and into the vagina, from there moving to the external orifice of the uterus, and onwards to the uterine cavity, fallopian tubes, ovaries, and peritoneal cavity. This can cause inflammation of the vulva and vagina. This causes vaginal discharge and itchiness of the vulva. The pinworms can also enter the urethra, and presumably, they carry intestinal bacteria with them. According to Gutierrez (2000), a statistically significant correlation between pinworm infection and urinary tract infections has been shown; however, Burkhart & Burkhart (2005) maintain that the incidence of pinworms as a cause of urinary tract infections remains unknown. Painful urination has been associated with pinworm infection. Sometimes, pinworms can be stopped before reaching the vaginal area.

The relationship between pinworm infestation and appendicitis (a condition in which the appendix becomes inflamed and filled with pus, causing pain) has been researched, but there is a lack of clear consensus on the matter: While Gutiérrez maintains that there exists a consensus that pinworms do not produce the inflammatory reaction, Cook (1994) states that it is controversial whether pinworms are causatively related to acute appendicitis, and Burkhart & Burkhart (2004) state that pinworm infection causes symptoms of appendicitis to surface.

== Cause ==
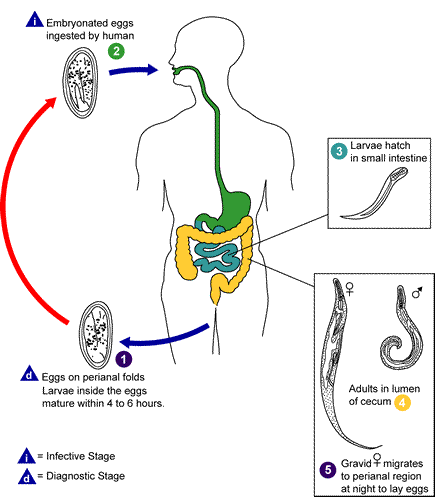
Pinworm life cycle.

The cause of a pinworm infection is the worm Enterobius vermicularis. The entire lifecycle – from egg to adult – takes place in the human gastrointestinal tract of a single human host. This process is two to eight weeks.

=== Spread ===
Pinworm infection spreads through human-to-human transmission, by swallowing infectious pinworm eggs. The eggs are hardy and can remain infectious in a moist environment for up to three weeks, though in a warm dry environment they usually last only 1–2 days. They do not tolerate heat well, but can survive in low temperatures: at −8 degrees Celsius (18 °F), two-thirds of the eggs are still viable after 18 hours.

After the eggs have been initially deposited near the anus, they are readily transmitted to other surfaces through contamination. The surface of the eggs is sticky when laid, and the eggs are readily transmitted from their initial deposit near the anus to fingernails, hands, night-clothing and bed linen. From here, eggs are further transmitted to food, water, furniture, toys, bathroom fixtures and other objects. Household pets often carry the eggs in their fur, while not actually being infected. Dust containing eggs can become airborne and widely dispersed when dislodged from surfaces, for instance when shaking out bed clothes and linen. Consequently, the eggs can enter the mouth and nose through inhalation, and be swallowed later. Although pinworms do not strictly multiply inside the body of their human host, some of the pinworm larvae may hatch on the anal mucosa, and migrate up the bowel and back into the gastrointestinal tract of the original host. This process is called retroinfection. According to Burkhart (2005), when this retroinfection occurs, it leads to a heavy parasitic load and ensures that the pinworm infestation continues. This statement is contradictory to a statement by Caldwell, who contends that retroinfection is rare and not clinically significant. Despite the limited, 13-week lifespan of individual pinworms, autoinfection (infection from the original host to itself), either through the anus-to-mouth route or through retroinfection, causes the pinworms to inhabit the same host indefinitely.

=== Life cycle ===
The life cycle begins with eggs being ingested. The eggs hatch in the duodenum (first part of the small intestine). The emerging pinworm larvae grow rapidly to a size of 140 to 150 micrometres, and migrate through the small intestine towards the colon. During this migration they moult twice and become adults. Females survive for 5 to 13 weeks, and males about 7 weeks. The male and female pinworms mate in the ileum (last part of the small intestine), whereafter the male pinworms usually die, and are passed out with stool. The gravid female pinworms settle in the ileum, caecum (beginning of the large intestine), appendix and ascending colon, where they attach themselves to the mucosa and ingest colonic contents. Almost the entire body of a gravid female becomes filled with eggs. The estimations of the number of eggs in a gravid female pinworm ranges from about 11,000 to 16,000. The egg-laying process begins approximately five weeks after initial ingestion of pinworm eggs by the human host. The gravid female pinworms migrate through the colon towards the rectum at a rate of 12 to 14 centimetres per hour. They emerge from the anus, and while moving on the skin near the anus, the female pinworms deposit eggs either through contracting and expelling the eggs, dying and then disintegrating, or bodily rupture due to the host scratching the worm. After depositing the eggs, the female becomes opaque and dies. The reason the female emerges from the anus is to obtain the oxygen necessary for the maturation of the eggs.

== Diagnosis ==
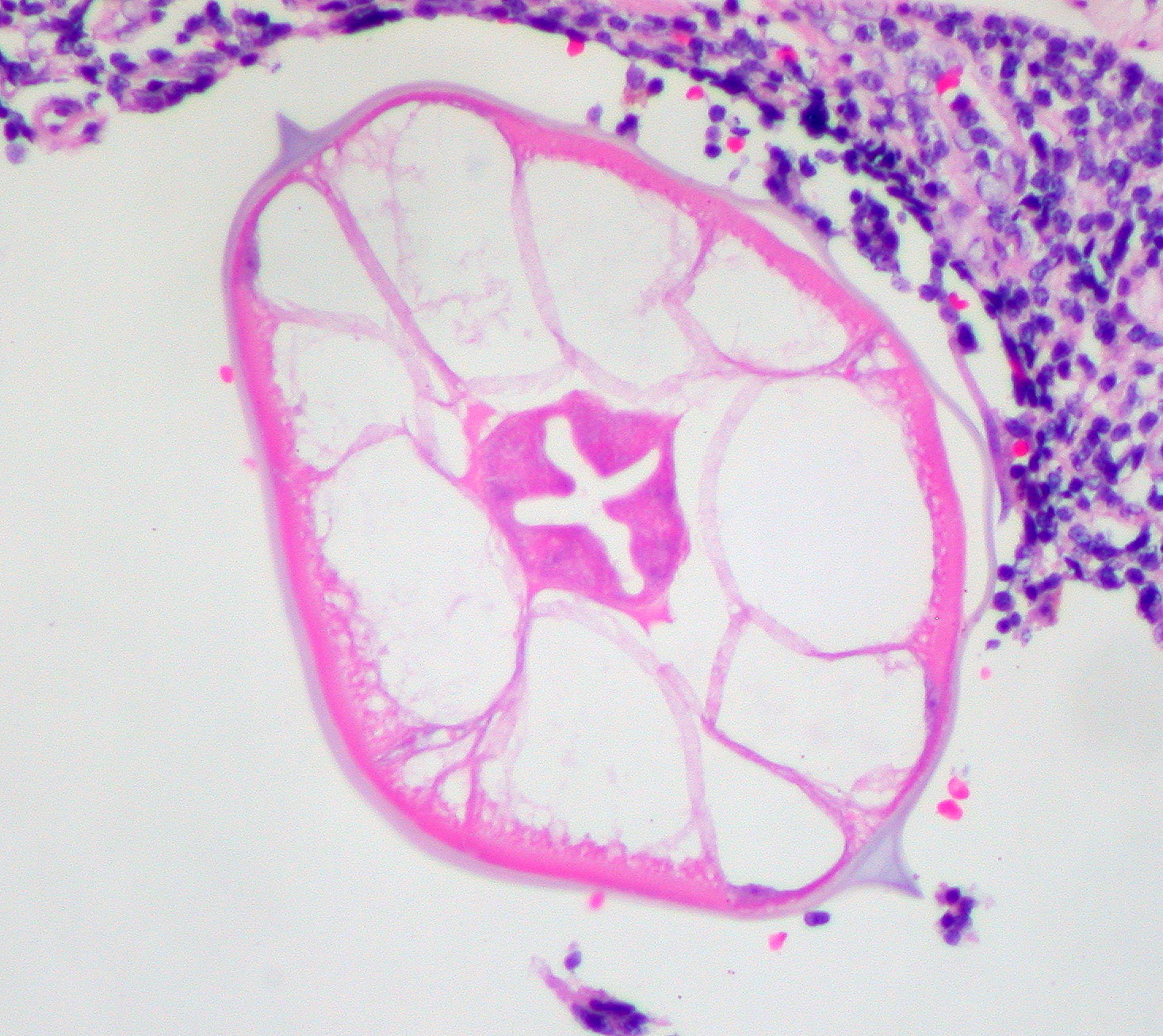
High magnification micrograph of a pinworm in cross section in the appendix. H&E stain.

Diagnosis relies on finding the eggs or the adult pinworms. Individual eggs are invisible to the naked eye, but they can be seen using a low-power microscope. On the other hand, the light-yellowish thread-like adult pinworms are clearly visually detectable, usually during the night when they move near the anus, or on toilet paper. Shining a flashlight on the infected individual's anus about one hour after they fall asleep is one form of detection and may show worms crawling out of the anus. Another form of detection is the use of transparent adhesive tape (e.g. Scotch Tape) applied on the anal area which will pick up deposited eggs, and diagnosis can be made by examining the tape with a microscope. This test is most successful if done every morning for several days, because the females do not lay eggs every day, and the number of eggs varies. A third method of diagnosis is examining a sample from under their fingernails under a microscope as itching around the anal area is common and therefore they may have collected some eggs under their nails as a result.

Pinworms do not lay eggs in the feces, but sometimes eggs are deposited in the intestine. As such, routine examination of fecal material gives a positive diagnosis in only 5 to 15% of infected subjects, and is therefore of little practical diagnostic use. In a heavy infection, female pinworms may adhere to stools that pass out through the anus, and they may thus be detected on the surface on the stool. Adult pinworms are occasionally seen during colonoscopy. On a microscopic level, pinworms have an identifying feature of alae (i.e., protruding ridges) running the length of the worm.

== Prevention ==
Pinworm infection cannot be totally prevented under most circumstances. This is due to the prevalence of the parasite and the ease of transmission through soiled night clothes, airborne eggs, contaminated furniture, toys and other objects. Infection may occur in the highest strata of society, where hygiene and nutritional status are typically high. The stigma associated with pinworm infection is hence considered a possible over-emphasis. Counselling is sometimes needed for upset parents who have discovered their children are infected, as they may not realize how prevalent the infection is.

Preventive action revolves around personal hygiene and the cleanliness of the living quarters. The rate of reinfection can be reduced through hygienic measures, and this is recommended especially in recurring cases.

The main measures are keeping fingernails short, and washing and scrubbing hands and fingers carefully, especially after defecation and before meals. Showering every morning is also highly recommended to wash off any eggs that may be still lying on the skin. Under ideal conditions, bed covers, sleeping garments, and hand towels should be changed daily and clothes and linens should be washed in hot water and then be placed in a hot dryer in order to kill off any eggs. Children can wear gloves while asleep, and the bedroom floor should be kept clean. Regular disinfection of kitchen and bathroom surfaces will help to prevent spread as well. Food should be covered to limit contamination with dust-borne parasite eggs. It is not recommended to shake clothes and bed linen as the eggs may detach and spread or to share clothes and towels. Nail biting and sucking on fingers is also discouraged.

== Treatment ==
Medication is the primary treatment for pinworm infection. However, reinfection is frequent regardless of the medication used. Total elimination of the parasite in a household may require repeated doses of medication for up to a year or more. Because the drugs kill the adult pinworms, but not the eggs, the first retreatment is recommended in two weeks. Also, if one household member spreads the eggs to another, it will be a matter of two or three weeks before those eggs become adult worms and thus amenable to treatment. Asymptomatic infections, often in small children, can serve as reservoirs of infection, and therefore the entire household should be treated regardless of whether or not symptoms are present.

The benzimidazole compounds albendazole (brand names e.g., Albenza, Eskazole, Zentel and Andazol) and mebendazole (brand names e.g., Ovex, Vermox, Antiox and Pripsen) are the most effective. They work by inhibiting the microtubule function in the pinworm adults, causing glycogen depletion, thereby effectively starving the parasite. A single 100 milligram dose of mebendazole with one repetition after two weeks, is considered the safest, and is usually effective with cure rate of 96%. Mebendazole has no serious side effects, although abdominal pain and diarrhea have been reported. Pyrantel pamoate (also called pyrantel embonate, brand names e.g., Reese's Pinworm Medicine, Pin-X, Combantrin, Anthel, Helmintox, and Helmex) kills adult pinworms through neuromuscular blockade, and is considered as effective as the benzimidazole compounds and is used as a second-line medication. In the US, Pyrantel pamoate is available over the counter and does not require a prescription. Pinworms located in the genitourinary system (in this case, female genital area) may require other drug treatments.

=== Treatment in pregnancy and breastfeeding ===
The available data on mebendazole, albendazole, and pyrantel pamoate use in pregnancy is limited and they are all assigned to pregnancy category level C. Treatment of a pinworm infection during pregnancy is only recommended for patients with significant symptoms that may be causing adverse effects to the pregnant woman such as loss of sleep and weight loss. Pyrantel pamoate is the treatment of choice in pregnancy but should be used only after consultation with a health care practitioner rather than self-treatment. Treatment should be avoided in the first trimester, and if possible done in the third trimester. If the pregnant woman is asymptomatic, then they should be treated after the baby is delivered.

Mebendazole has less than 10% of the oral dose absorbed into systemic circulation with a clinically insignificant amount of drug excreted in breastmilk, and therefore treatment should not be withheld during breastfeeding. There is limited data on the use of pyrantel pamoate and albendazole in breastfeeding but WHO also classifies them as compatible with breastfeeding. This is due to the drugs acting mainly in the intestinal system of the mother with only a very small amount of drug being absorbed into the systemic circulation.

== Epidemiology ==
Pinworm infection occurs worldwide, and is the most common helminth (i.e., parasitic worm) infection in the United States and Western Europe. In the United States, a study by the Center of Disease Control reported an overall incidence rate of 11.4% among people of all ages. Pinworms are particularly common in children with approximately 30% of children being infected and most commonly seen in children between 7 and 11 years old. The prevalence rates in children having been reported as high as 61% in India, 50% in England, 39% in Thailand, 37% in Sweden, and 29% in Denmark. Finger sucking has been shown to increase both incidence and relapse rates, and nail biting has been similarly associated. Because it spreads from host to host through contamination, enterobiasis is common among people living in close contact, and tends to occur in all people within a household. The prevalence of pinworms is not associated with gender, nor with any particular social class, race, or culture. Pinworms are an exception to the tenet that intestinal parasites are uncommon in affluent communities.

== History ==
The earliest known instance of pinworms is evidenced by pinworm eggs found in coprolite, carbon dated to 7837 BC at western Utah. Pinworm infection is not classified as a neglected tropical disease unlike many other parasitic worm infections.

Garlic has been used as a treatment in the ancient cultures of China, India, Egypt, and Greece. Hippocrates mentioned garlic as a remedy against intestinal parasites. German botanist Adam Lonicer also recommended garlic against parasitic worms.
