= Phasmid =

Phasmid may refer to:

- Phasmid (nematode anatomy), a sensory structure in nematodes
- Phasmatodea, the order of insects which contains stick insects, walking sticks, ghost insects and leaf insects
- Phagemid, a vector used in gene cloning
