= Worm bagging =

Form of pathological egg retention observed in nematodes

Worm bagging (also referred to as endotokia matricida) is a form of pathological egg retention observed in nematodes, namely Caenorhabditis elegans. The process is characterized by eggs hatching within the parent and the larvae proceeding to consume and emerge from the parent.

== History ==
While the phenomenon was mentioned as a result of fluorodeoxyuridine treatment as early as 1979 and egg-laying mutants were identified in 1984, the natural circumstances and mechanisms resulting in this behavior were not fully explored until 2003. From this point, modest explorations of the mechanisms underlying this behavior have been observed.

== Proximate causes ==
Bagging will occur in vulvaless or egg-laying mutants of C. elegans but can also be induced in wild-type strains. Identified stressors that can induce bagging are starvation, high salt concentration, and antagonistic bacteria.

It has been observed in larval development, that the WRT-5 protein is secreted into the pharyngeal lumen and the pharyngeal expression changes in a cycle that is connected to the molting cycle. Deletion mutations in wrt-5 cause embryonic lethality, which are temperature sensitive and more severe at 15 degrees C than at 25 degrees C. Additionally, animals that hatch exhibit variable abnormal morphology, for example, bagging worms, blistering, molting defects, or Roller phenotypes.

Internal hatching is initiated by genes and is not restricted to the widely used laboratory strain N2. Internal hatching is rare when worms are maintained under standard laboratory conditions. However, axenic condition which is a transfer from solid to liquid medium along with adverse environmental conditions, such as starvation, exposure to harsh compounds, and bacteria can increase the frequency of worm bags.

In a study C. elegans were starved and in stressful conditions such as a high salt environment. As a result there was a connection drawn between the pathway leading to the dauer stage and the pathway leading to bagging. Bagging was seen to be induced under stress, and was reversible if worms were relieved of the stress before internal larvae caused too much damage to the adult. Also, there was evidence of larvae developing in the adult and consuming parent body contents prior to emerging from the parent body.

== Ultimate causes ==
Larvae of internal hatching could have gonad damage, which reduces fitness of those individuals. Internally hatched larvae also survived equally as well or even better than externally hatched worms. This means that worm bagging does not negatively influence the size or survival of the offspring. The destruction of the mother provides nutrients to the offspring, which is an efficient transfer of nutrients. In environments that lead to the starvation of individuals, worm bagging is beneficial because it improves the chances of offspring survival and the passing of their genes. If worm bagging does not occur in these environments, offspring will have an increased chance of starvation and removing their genes from the gene pool.

=== Other species ===
Aside from C. elegans, Bagging is known to occur in other nematode species including: Haemonchus contortus, Mehdinema allii, and Metacrobeles amblyurus. This phenomenon may be conserved among these species because it is a "life-history trait". Offspring survivability is enhanced through bagging in a stressful environment as the young are physically protected through development to the larval stage and nourished through consumption of the parent body.

== Future research ==
While egg-laying mutants have been characterized, the natural processes that result in facultative vivipary have not been fully explored. Aging-related degeneration of the egg-laying system has been implicated in egg retention but the mechanism by which starvation signals result in this process has not been described. Experiments demonstrating time-dependent up/downregulation of genes (in nervous and vulval cells) throughout the span of the process would provide insight into the proximate causes. This research may provide insight into the mechanisms involved in the induction of egg-laying and may also improve understanding of birthing signals in higher organisms.
