= Nematode.net =

Nematode.net is a publicly available resource dedicated to the study of parasitic nematodes. It stemmed from an Expressed Sequence Tag (EST) project that began at The Genome Institute at Washington University School of Medicine. The site was launched in 2000 to accompany the project “A Genomic Approach to Parasites from the Phylum Nematoda,” funded by the National Institute of Allergy and Infectious Diseases (NIAID). It was created to provide access to the data from this project and as a broader resource for the scientific community studying parasitic nematodes.

== History ==
The first model nematode to be sequenced was Caenorhabditis elegans. It was also the first fully sequenced genome of a multicellular organism to be completed. Nematode.net built on these efforts to make available the gene sequences from medically and economically relevant parasitic nematodes. Human parasitic nematodes, or roundworms, have wide-ranging global health implications, producing a disease burden that exceeds malaria and tuberculosis. Plant parasitic nematodes cause over $100 billion in annual crop damage worldwide.

== Tools ==
When Nematode.net began in 2000, it provided a searchable repository for nematode EST sequences that were not available elsewhere. The site now also provides tools for viewing protein and metabolic pathways, and a comparative genomics platform that can aid in nematode drug, vaccine and pesticide research.

Tools available on Nematode.net include:

- HelmCoP - an online resource aiming to help researchers develop strategies for drug, vaccine and pesticide prioritization, while also providing a useful comparative genomics platform.
- NemaBLAST - a tool allowing the alignment of user defined protein or nucleotide sequence against nematode transcripts or cDNA reads organized by organism or library.
- NemaPath - a tool for exploring metabolic (and other) pathways in various nematodes. In single organism mode this tool populates pathway images by merit of aligning transcripts or genes to KEGG Orthology (KO) ids that are known to exist in that pathway. In dual organism mode this tool allows for the comparison of the pathway usage of any two nematodes in the database. Host and clade specific comparative views are also available.
- NemaGene - a data mining tool allowing the user to search for transcripts by name, or to explore transcript expression by life cycle stage in a given organism.
- NemaFam - a collection of nematode-related conserved regions of proteins.
- NemaBrowse - a data viewer for genes predicted from nematode genomes.
- NemaSNP - an online resource showing genetic variations among populations of nematodes.
