= Skrjabinema =

Scientific classification
- Domain: Eukaryota
- Kingdom: Animalia
- Phylum: Nematoda
- Class: Chromadorea
- Order: Rhabditida
- Family: Oxyuridae
- Genus: Skrjabinema

Genus of roundworms

Skrjabinema is a genus of nematodes within the Oxyuridae family. Species of this genus typically parasitise ruminants. For example, the nematode Skrjabinema ovis invades the intestinal tract of the guanaco, Lama guanicoe, subsequent to the ingestion of eggs of this worm.
