= Pruritus scroti =

- Specialty: Dermatology

Pruritus scroti is itchiness of the scrotum that may be secondary to an infectious cause.

== See also ==
- Pruritus vulvae
- Pruritus ani
- Pruritus
