= Phasmid (nematode anatomy) =

Nematode anatomical structure

Phasmids are sensilla in the lateral tail region of certain species of nematodes. They are similar in their structure to amphid sensilla, but smaller. One classification system for nematodes places nematodes with phasmids into class Secernentea and nematodes without phasmids into class Adenophorea. Phasmid neurons were recently shown to function in modulation of chemorepulsion behavior in Caenorhabditis elegans. In C. elegans, the right phasmid contains two sensory neurons, while the left contains three, protected by sheath and socket cells. The cilia of the dendrites of the PHA and PHB neurons project through the phasmid openings, while the PQR neuronal process present on the left side is wrapped by a socket cell.
