= Adenophorea =

Class of roundworms

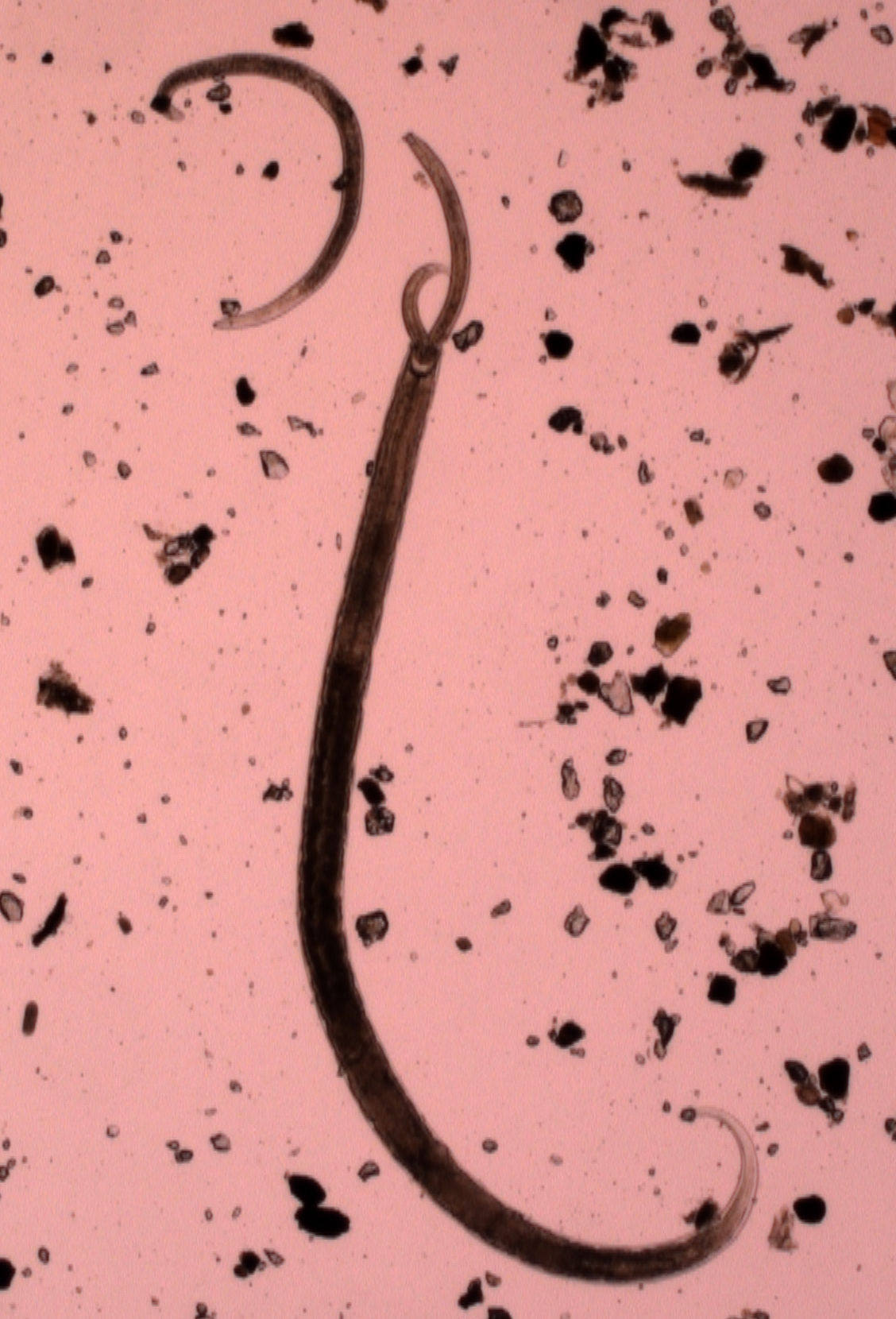
Mononchidae eating a Mononchidae

Adenophorea or Aphasmidia was a class of nematodes (roundworms). It has been by and large abandoned by modern taxonomy, because there is strong evidence for it being a motley paraphyletic group of unrelated lineages of roundworms.

== Description ==
Amphids of Adenophoreas are always post-labial and pore-like.

Deirids are not seen in Adenophoreas.

Phasmids are also generally absent in Adenophoreas.

Adenophreas have uninucleate hypodermal glands.

Adenophoreas' excretory system is simple and non-tubular when present.

Adenophoreas commonly have three caudal glands. The opening is through a spinneret at the tail tip.

Male Adenophoreas generally have two testes.

Caudal alae are rare in Adenophoreas.

Male Adenophoreas have supplement glands situated in a single ventro-median row.

Sensory papillae of Adenophoreas are in the cephalic region and along the body.

Generally, Adenophoreas have five esophageal glands.

Adenophorea are either marine, freshwater or terrestrial or three of them together or any two of them.

A number of these traits above are plesiomorphic, and thus unsuitable to discern relationships.

== See also ==
- Secernentea
