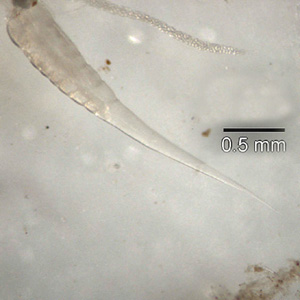
- Pinworms (U.S.)/Threadworms (U.K.) (Enterobius vermicularis)

Scientific classification
- Kingdom: Animalia
- Phylum: Nematoda
- Class: Chromadorea
- Order: Rhabditida
- Family: Oxyuridae
- Genus: Enterobius; Baird, 1853

Species
- Enterobius anthropopitheci (Gedoelst, 1916) (chimpanzee pinworm); Enterobius atelis Cameron, 1929; Enterobius brevicauda Sandosham, 1950; Enterobius buckleyi Sandosham, 1950; Enterobius callithricis Solomon, 1932; Enterobius duplicidens Buckley, 1931; Enterobius emodensis; Enterobius foecunda (Linstow, 1879); Enterobius gregorii (Hugot, 1983) (disputed); Enterobius inglisi; Enterobius interlabiata Sandosham, 1950; Enterobius lagothricis Buckley, 1931; Enterobius lemuris Baehr, 1935; Enterobius lerouxi Sandosham, 1950; Enterobius macaci; Enterobius magnispicula; Enterobius paraguerezae; Enterobius parallela (Linstow, 1908); Enterobius pesteri; Enterobius pitheci Cameron, 1929; Enterobius polyoon (Linstow, 1909); Enterobius pygatrichus; Enterobius schaefferae; Enterobius shriveri; Enterobius vermicularis (Linnaeus, 1758) (human pinworm); Enterobius yagoi Sutton, 1979

= Pinworm (parasite) =

Species of worm

The pinworm (species Enterobius vermicularis), also known as threadworm (in the United Kingdom, Australia and New Zealand) or seatworm, is a parasitic worm. It is a nematode (roundworm) and a common intestinal parasite or helminth, especially in humans. The medical condition associated with pinworm infestation is known as pinworm infection (enterobiasis) (a type of helminthiasis) or less precisely as oxyuriasis in reference to the family Oxyuridae.

Other than human, Enterobius vermicularis were reported from bonnet macaque. Other species seen in primates include Enterobius buckleyi in Orangutan and Enterobius anthropopitheci in chimpanzee. Enterobius vermicularis is common in human children and transmitted via the faecal-oral route. Humans are the only natural host of Enterobius vermicularis. Enterobius gregorii, another human species is morphologically indistinguishable from Enterobius vermicularis except the spicule size. Throughout this article, the word "pinworm" refers to Enterobius. In British usage, however, pinworm refers to Strongyloides, while Enterobius is called threadworm.

== Classification ==
The pinworm (genus Enterobius) is a type of roundworm (nematode), and three species of pinworm have been identified with certainty. Humans are hosts only to Enterobius vermicularis (formerly Oxyurias vermicularis). Chimpanzees are host to Enterobius anthropopitheci, which is morphologically distinguishable from the human pinworm. Hugot (1983) claims another species affects humans, Enterobius gregorii, which is supposedly a sister species of E. vermicularis, and has a slightly smaller spicule (i.e., sexual organ). Its existence is controversial, however; Totkova et al. (2003) consider the evidence to be insufficient, and Hasegawa et al. (2006) contend that E. gregorii is a younger stage of E. vermicularis. Regardless of its status as a distinct species, E. gregorii is considered clinically identical to E. vermicularis.

== Morphology ==
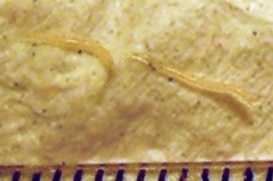
Two female pinworms next to a ruler: The markings are 1 mm apart.

The adult female has a sharply pointed posterior end, is 8 to 13 mm long, and 0.5 mm thick. The adult male is considerably smaller, measuring 2 to 5 mm long and 0.2 mm thick, and has a curved posterior end. The eggs are translucent and have a surface that adheres to objects. The eggs measure 50 to 60 μm by 20 to 30 μm, and have a thick shell flattened on one side. The small size and colourlessness of the eggs make them invisible to the naked eye, except in barely visible clumps of thousands of eggs. Eggs may contain a developing embryo or a fully developed pinworm larva. The larvae grow to 140–150 μm in length.

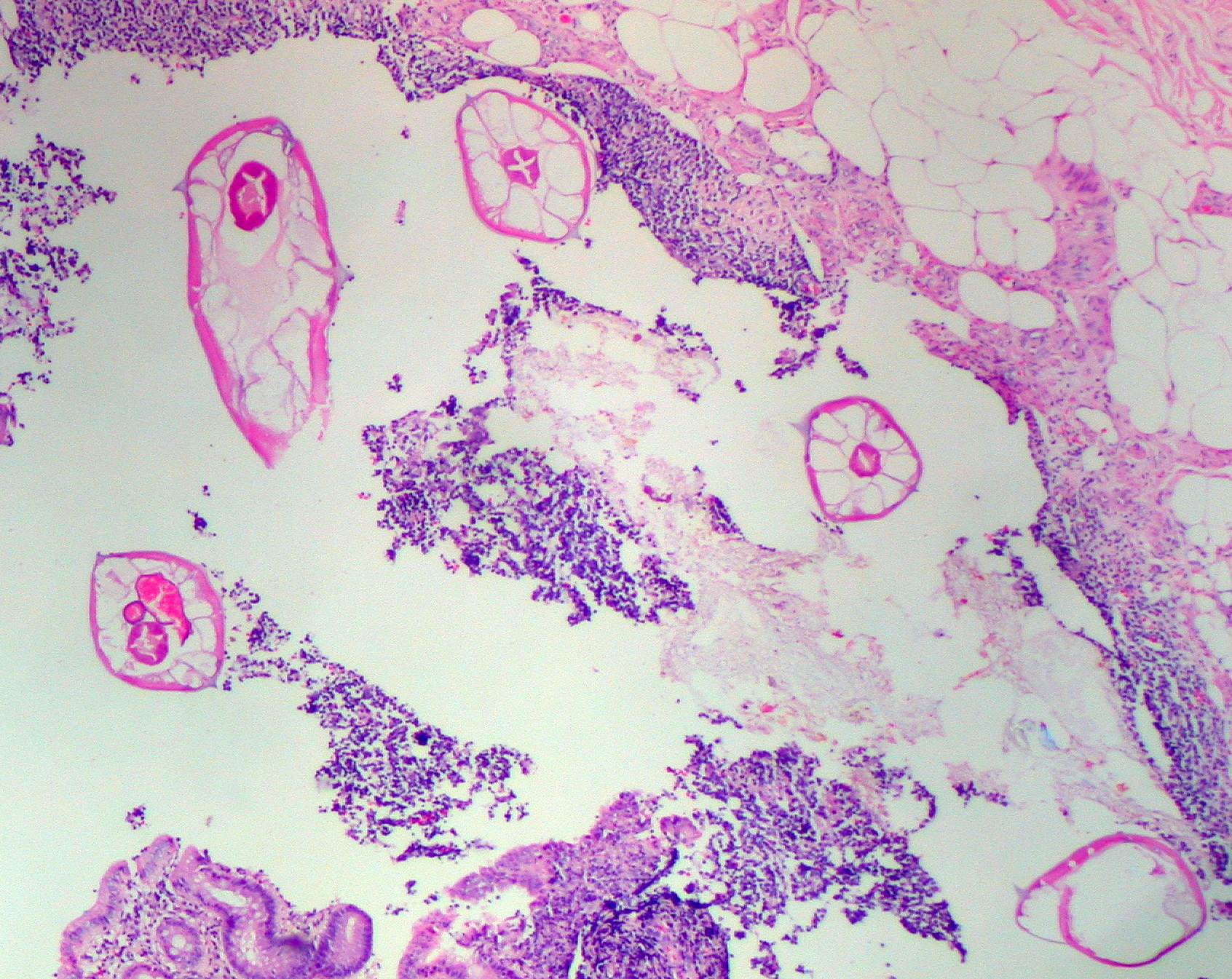
Pinworms are sometimes diagnosed incidentally by pathology. Micrograph of pinworms in the appendix, H&E stain

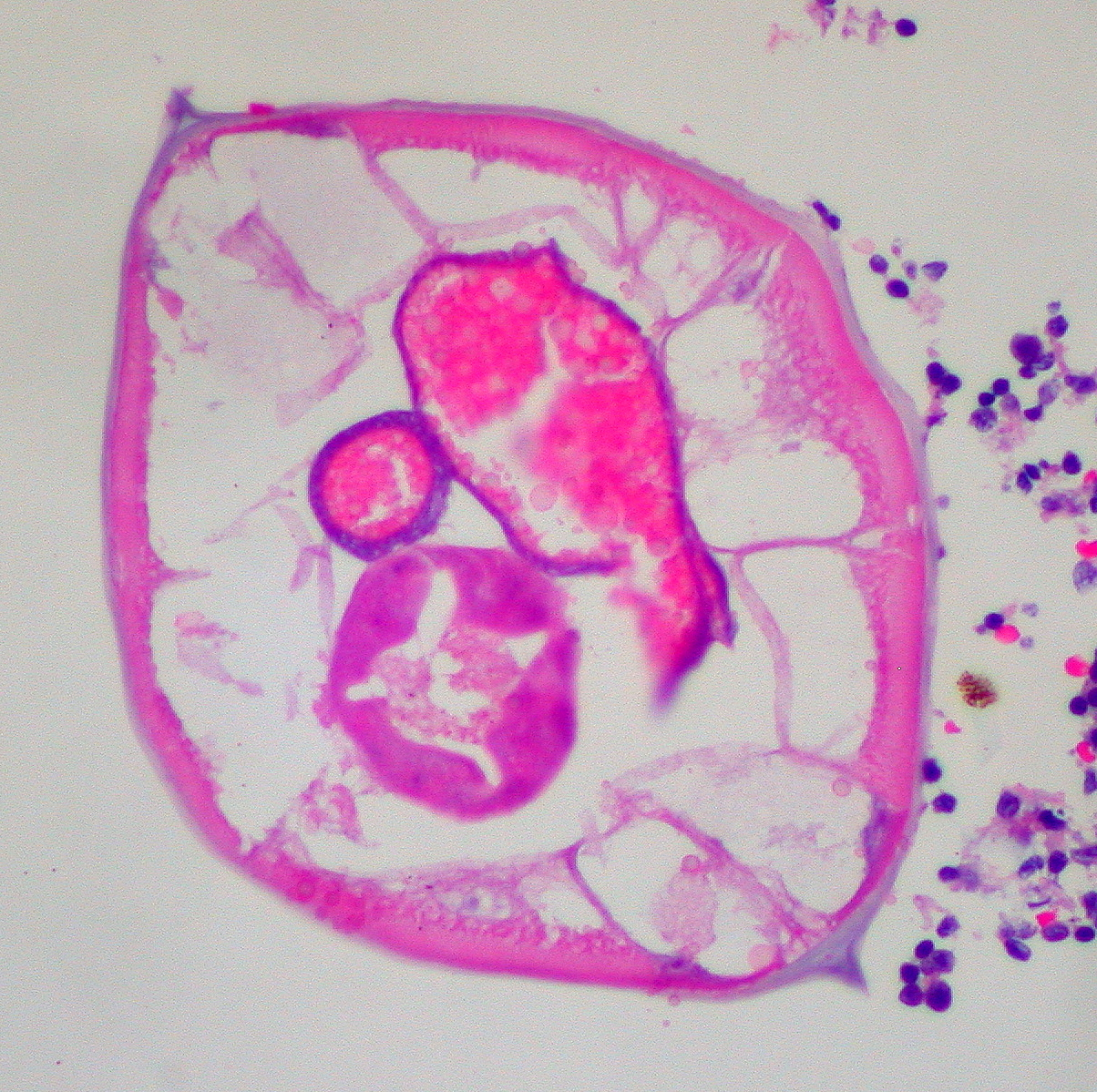
High magnification micrograph of a pinworm in cross section in the appendix, H&E stain

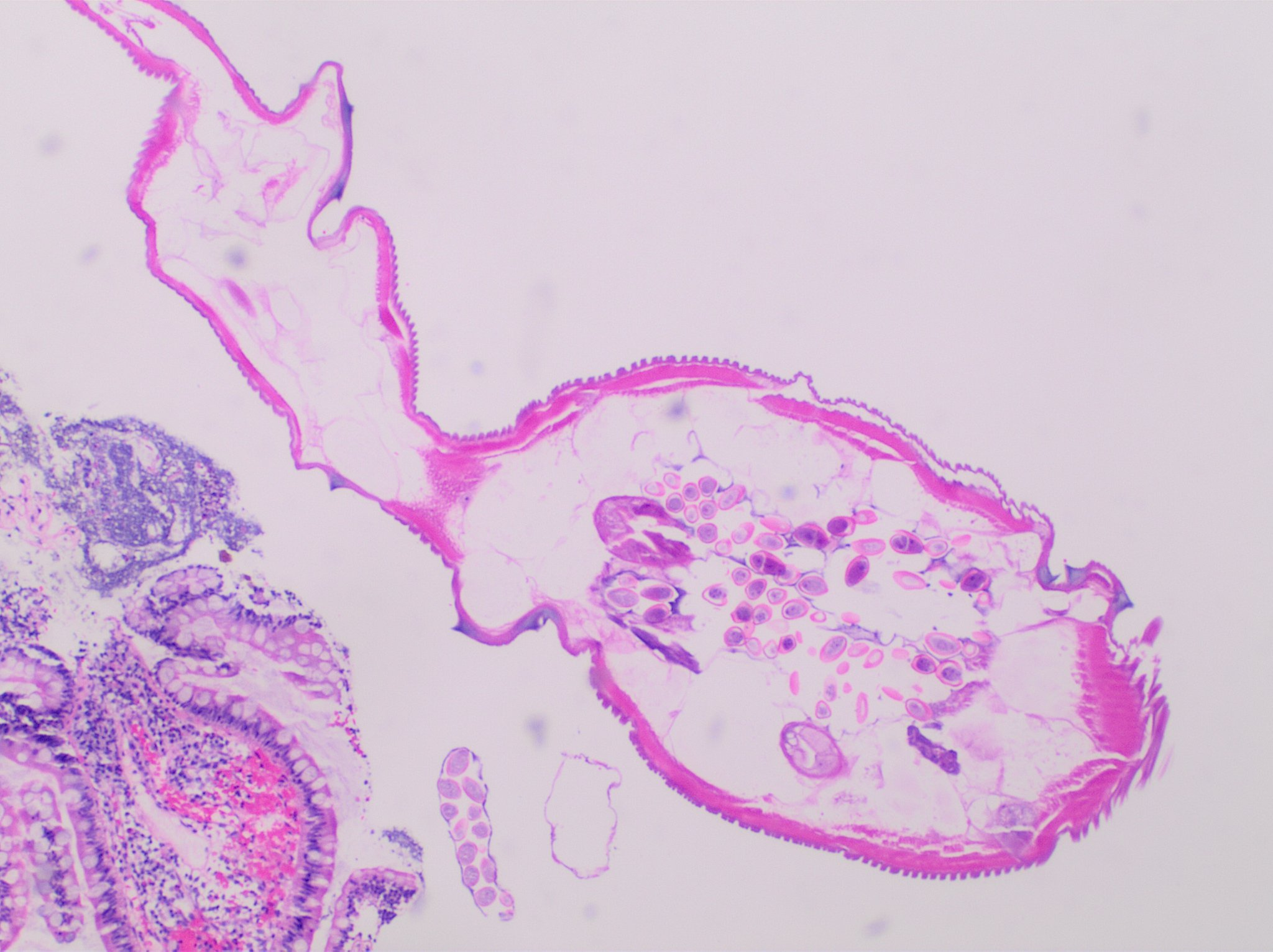
Partially longitudinal cross-section of Enterobius vermicularis, H&E stain

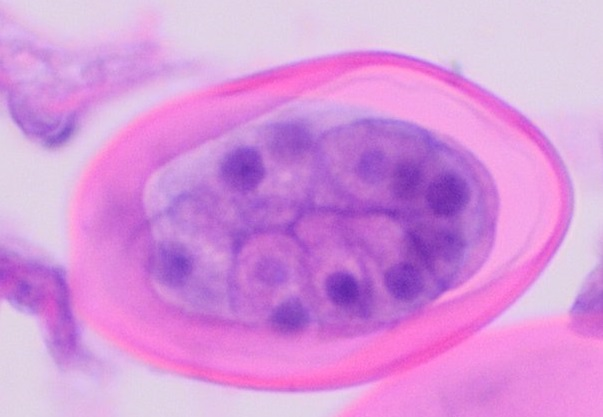
Cross-section of early E. vermicularis egg, H&E stain

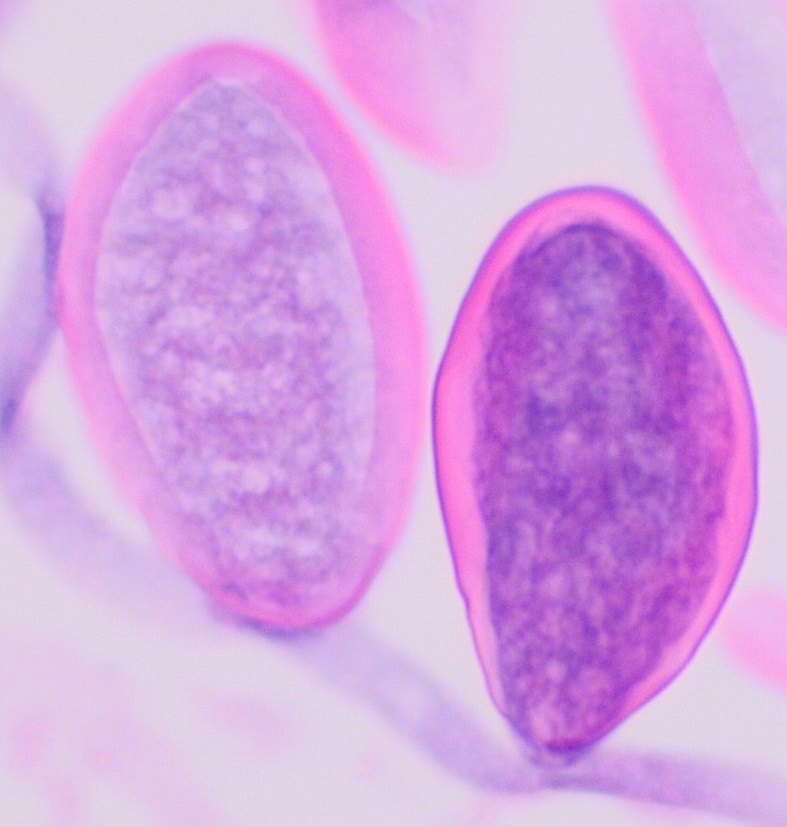
Later E. vermicularis eggs, of the same size as early eggs but having undergone more mitoses. H&E stain

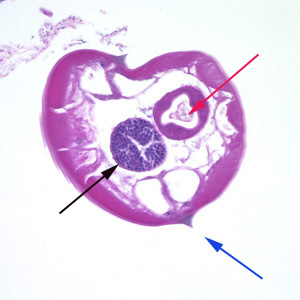
Pinworms are sometimes diagnosed incidentally by pathology: Micrograph of male pinworm in cross section, alae (blue arrow), intestine (red arrow) and testis (black arrow), H&E stain

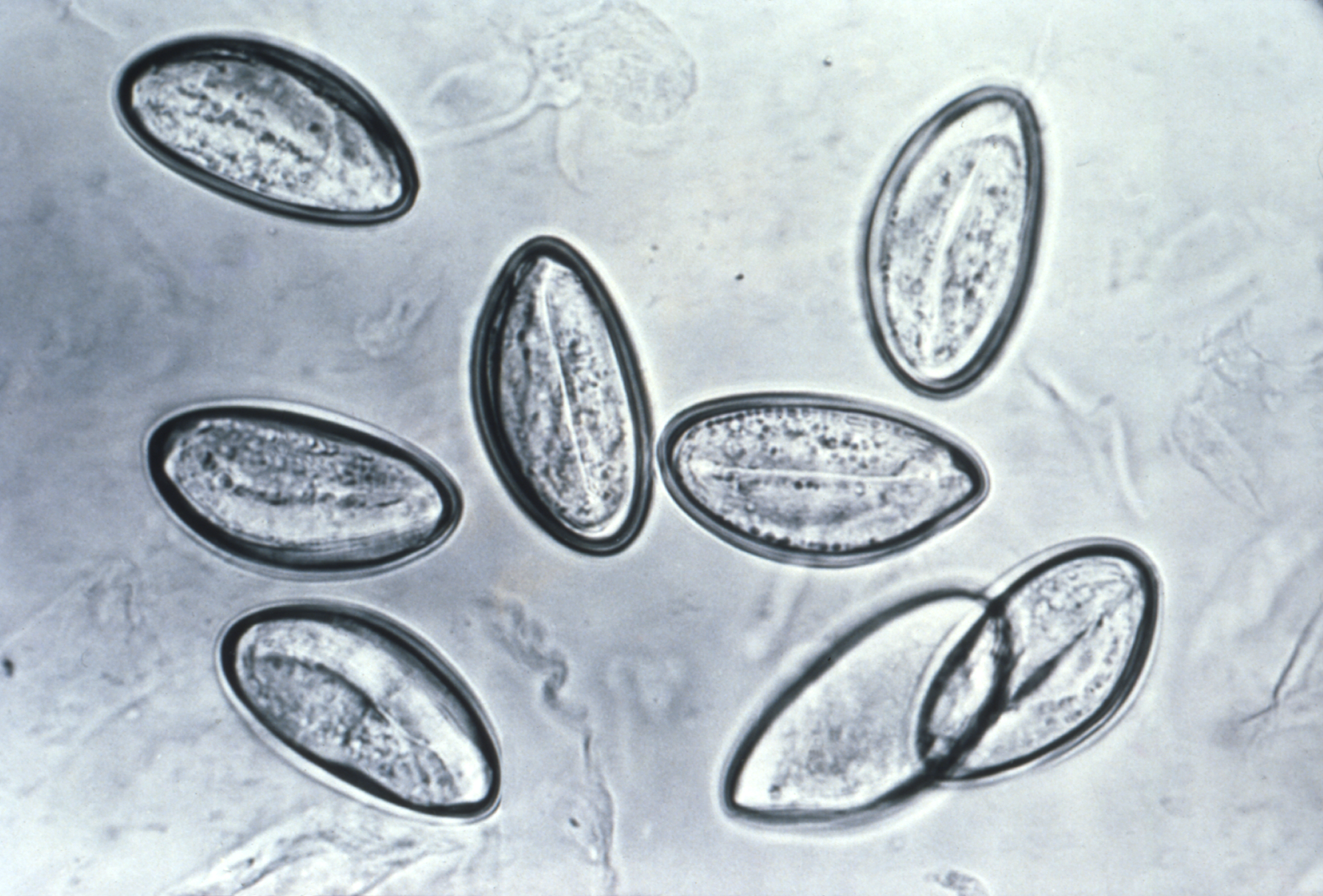
Pinworm eggs are easily seen under a microscope.

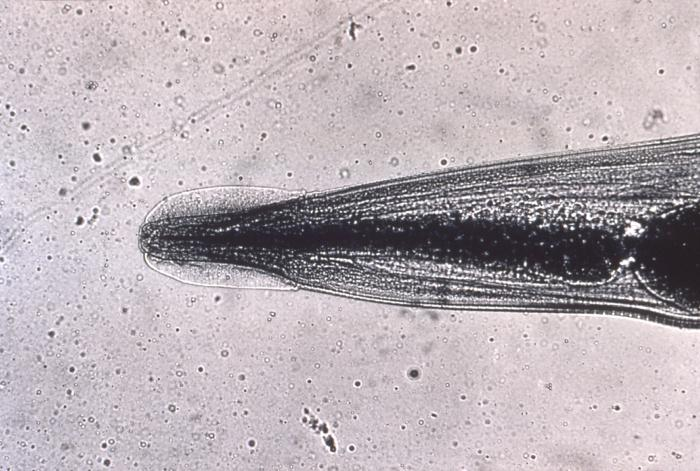
This micrograph reveals the cephalic alae in the head region of E. vermicularis.

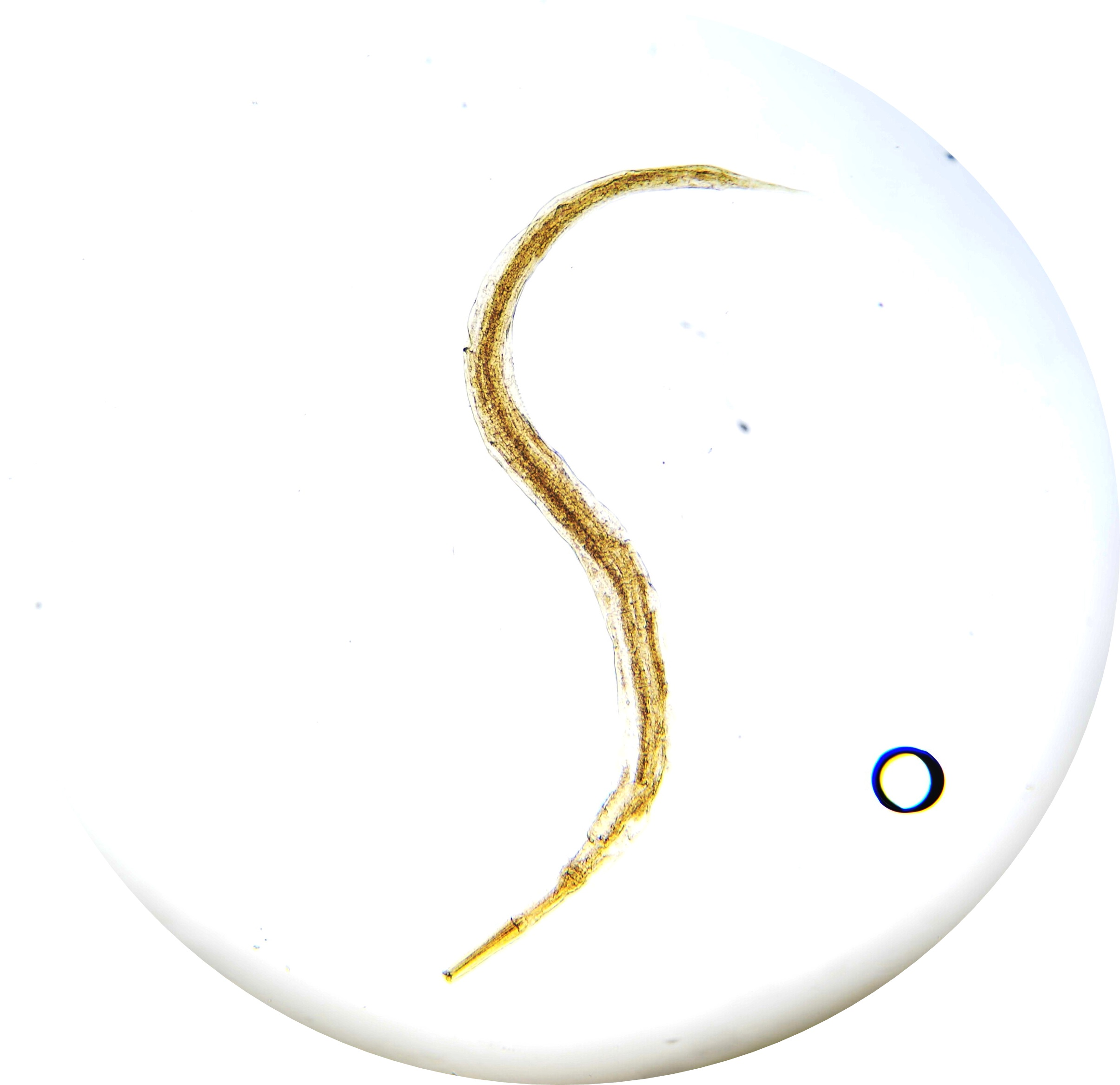
E. vermicularis

== Life cycle ==
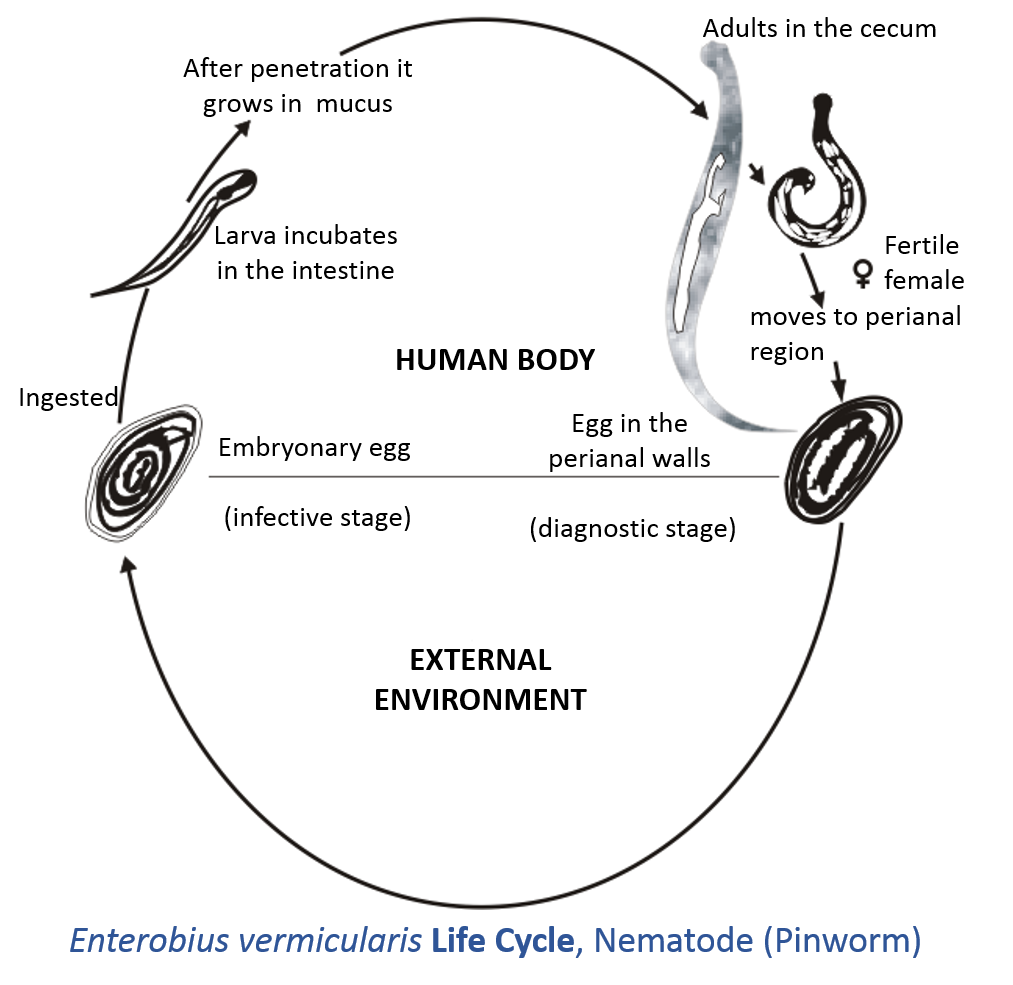
Life cycle of E. vermicularis showing the stages inside and outside of the human body

The entire life cycle, from egg to adult, takes place in the human gastrointestinal tract of a single host, from about 2–4 weeks or about 4–8 weeks. E. vermicularis molts four times; the first two within the egg before hatching and two before becoming an adult worm.

Although infection often occurs via ingestion of embryonated eggs by inadequate hand washing or nail biting, inhalation followed by swallowing of airborne eggs may occur rarely. The eggs hatch in the duodenum (i.e., first part of the small intestine). The emerging pinworm larvae grow rapidly to a size of 140 to 150 μm, and migrate through the small intestine towards the colon. During this migration, they moult twice and become adults. Females survive for 5 to 13 weeks, and males about 7 weeks. The male and female pinworms mate in the ileum (i.e., last part of the small intestine), whereafter the male pinworms usually die, and are passed out with stool. The gravid female pinworms settle in the ileum, caecum (i.e., beginning of the large intestine), appendix and ascending colon, where they attach themselves to the mucosa and ingest colonic contents.

Almost the entire body of a gravid female becomes filled with eggs. The estimations of the number of eggs in a gravid female pinworm range from about 11,000 to 16,000. The egg-laying process begins about five weeks after initial ingestion of pinworm eggs by the human host. The gravid female pinworms migrate through the colon towards the rectum at a rate of 12 to 14 cm per hour. They emerge from the anus, and while moving on the skin near the anus, the female pinworms deposit eggs either through (1) contracting and expelling the eggs, (2) dying and then disintegrating, or (3) bodily rupture due to the host scratching the worm. After depositing the eggs, the female becomes opaque and dies. The female emerges from the anus to obtain the oxygen necessary for the maturation of the eggs.

== Infection ==
E. vermicularis causes the medical condition pinworm infection also known as enterobiasis, whose primary symptom is itching in the anal area. Extraintestinal disease is rare and most commonly involves the female reproductive tract, but spleen abscess has also been reported. In conditions of rural poverty, Enterobius vermicularis infections are reported to be correlated with stunting and lower mean I.Q. among prepubescent children.

== Diagnosis and treatment ==
A parasitic pinworm infection can be diagnosed by examining the anal area for visible eggs or worms, ideally at night due to the nocturnal nature of E. vermicularis. Another common at-home test is referred to as the “tape test”, during which tape is applied to the skin around the anus, preferably in the morning before showering or using the toilet. If any eggs are present, they will stick to the tape, which can then be taken to be examined by a medical professional. Once diagnosed, pinworm infections can be treated with an anti-parasite medication that will kill the worms.

The medications that are most commonly prescribed for pinworms are albendazole and mebendazole. Initially, a single dose will be given, then followed by a repeat dose two weeks later in order to eliminate any newly-hatched worms that may be present.

== Distribution ==
The pinworm has a worldwide distribution, and is the cause of the most common helminthiasis (parasitic worm infection) in the United States, western Europe, and Oceania. In the United States, a study by the Center of Disease Control reported an overall incidence rate of 11.4% among children. Pinworms are particularly common in children, with prevalence rates in this age group having been reported as high as 61% in India, 50% in England, 39% in Thailand, 37% in Sweden, and 29% in Denmark. Finger sucking has been shown to increase both incidence and relapse rates, and nail biting has been similarly associated. Because it spreads from host to host through contamination, pinworms are common among people living in close contact, and tends to occur in all people within a household. The prevalence of pinworms is not associated with gender, nor with any particular social class, race, or culture, but tends to have a higher rate of prevalence in those with learning difficulties. Pinworms are an exception to the tenet that intestinal parasites are uncommon in affluent communities.

A fossilized nematode egg was detected in 240 million-year-old fossil dung, showing that parasitic pinworms already infested pre-mammalian cynodonts. The earliest known instance of the pinworms associated with humans is evidenced by pinworm eggs found in human coprolites carbon dated to 7837 BC found in western Utah.

== See also ==
- Roundworm, hookworm, ringworm (similarly named parasites and fungi)
