= Pruritus vulvae =

Itching of the vulva

Pruritus vulvae is itchiness of the vulva, which is the counterpart of pruritus scroti, and may have many different causes. Patch testing may be used to diagnose the cause.

== Causes ==
This condition is a symptom of an underlying condition more often than it is a primary condition. Vulva irritation can be caused by any moisture left on the skin. This moisture may be perspiration, urine, vaginal discharge or small amounts of stool. It may be caused by vaginal infections, vulvitis, HPV (human papilloma virus) infection, anal incontinence, Bowen's disease, or dietary irritants (caffeine, potatoes, chilli, capsicum, tomatoes, and peanuts).

Treatment with antibiotics can lead to a yeast infection and irritation of the vulva. Some diseases increase the possibility of yeast infections, such as diabetes mellitus.

Chronic inflammation of the vulva predisposes to the development of premalignant or malignant changes.
