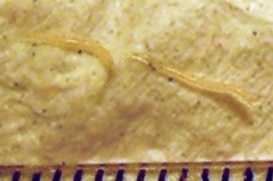
- Pinworms (Enterobius vermicularis)

Scientific classification
- Kingdom: Animalia
- Phylum: Nematoda
- Class: Chromadorea
- Order: Rhabditida
- Superfamily: Oxyuroidea
- Family: Oxyuridae

Genera
- See § Genera

= Oxyuridae =

Family of roundworms

Oxyuridae is a family of nematode worms of the class Secernentea.

== Genera ==
Oxyuridae contains the following genera:

- Neoparathelandros Hodda, 2022
- Tlacuatzoxyuris Jiminez, Caspeta Mandujano & Albino Miranda, 2019

=== Subfamily Oxyurinae Weinland, 1858 ===
- Acanthoxyurus Sandground, 1928
- Adelonema Mawson, 1978
- Anaspiculuris Akhtar, 1955
- Archeonema Ricci, 1988
- Auchenacantha Baylis, 1929
- Austroxyuris Johnson & Mawson, 1938
- Avilandras Skryabin & Schikhobalova in Skryabin, 1951
- Biguetius Chabaud, Petter & Golvan, 1961
- Caroloxyuris Jimenez Ruiz & Gardner, 2003
- Citellina Prendel, 1928
- Didelphoxyuris Gardner & Hugot, 1995
- Enterobius Leach, 1853
- Evaginuris Skryabin & Schikhobalova, 1951
- Furconema Gairola & Malhotra, 1988
- Gynaecometra Araujo, 1978
- Haplacis Railliet & Henry, 1916
- Helminthoxys Freitas, Lent & Almeida, 1937
- Heteromyoxyuris Quentin, 1973
- Hilgertia Quentin, 1973
- Hoepplius Chu, 1931
- Hoplodontophorus Turner, 1921
- Idiuoxyuris Hugot, 1988
- Lemuricola Chabaud & Petter, 1959
- Lepusius Farooq & Khatoon, 1995
- Lobatorobius Skryabin & Schikhobalova in Skryabin, 1951
- Macropoxyuris Mawson, 1964
- Monodelphoxyuris Guerrero & Hugot, 2003
- Neohilgertia Navone, Suriano & Pujol, 1990
- Neyrapharyngodon Calvente, 1948
- Odontogeton Allgén, 1925
- Oxyuris Rudolphi, 1803
- Oxyuronema Kreis, 1932
- Paraicosiella Majumdar & Chakravarty, 1963
- Paraoxyuronema Artigas, 1937
- Paraspiculuris Akhtar, 1955
- Paraustroxyuris Mawson, 1964
- Passalurus Dujardin, 1845
- Potoroxyuris Mawson, 1964
- Protozoophaga Travassos, 1923
- Pseudaspiculuris Akhtar, 1955
- Rauschtineria Hugot, 1980
- Skrjabinema Werestchajin, 1926
- Skryabineandros Markov, 1962
- Subaspiculuris Akhtar, 1955
- Syphabulea Gubanov, 1964
- Syphacia Seurat, 1916
- Syphaciuris Skryabin & Schikhobalova in Skryabin, 1951
- Sypharista Quentin, 1971
- Syphatineria Chabaud & Biocca, 1955
- Trypanoxyuris Vevers, 1923
- Wellcomia Sambon, 1907
- Xeroxyuris Hugot, 1995
- Zenkoxyuris Quentin, 1975
