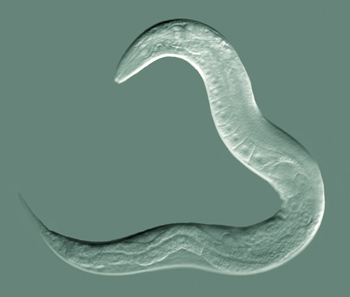
- Caenorhabditis elegans, a model species of roundworm

Scientific classification
- Kingdom: Animalia
- Subkingdom: Eumetazoa
- Clade: ParaHoxozoa
- Clade: Bilateria
- Clade: Nephrozoa
- Clade: Protostomia
- Superphylum: Ecdysozoa
- Clade: Nematoida
- Phylum: Nematoda; Diesing, 1861

Classes
- Chromadorea; Enoplea; (see text)

Synonyms
- Nematodes Burmeister, 1837; Nematoidea sensu stricto Cobb, 1919; Nemates Cobb, 1919; Nemata Cobb, 1919 emend.

= Nematode =

Nematode Temporal range: Early Devonian – Recent Possible Cambrian occurrence

Phylum of worms with a flexible cuticle

The nematodes (/ˈnɛməˌtoʊdz, ˈniːmə-/ NEM-ə-tohdz, NEE-mə-), roundworms or eelworms constitute the phylum Nematoda (Ancient Greek: Νηματώδη; Latin: Nematoda). Species in the phylum inhabit a broad range of environments. Most species are free-living, feeding on microorganisms, but many are parasitic. Parasitic worms (helminths) are the cause of soil-transmitted helminthiases.

They are classified along with arthropods, tardigrades and other moulting animals in the clade Ecdysozoa. Unlike the flatworms, nematodes have a tubular digestive system, with openings at both ends. Like tardigrades, they have a reduced number of Hox genes, but their sister phylum Nematomorpha has kept the ancestral protostome Hox genotype, which shows that the reduction has occurred within the nematode phylum.

Nematode species can be difficult to distinguish from one another. Consequently, estimates of the number of nematode species are uncertain. A 2013 survey of animal biodiversity suggested there are over 25,000. Estimates of the total number of extant species are subject to even greater variation. A widely referenced 1993 article estimated there might be over a million species of nematode. A subsequent publication challenged this claim, estimating the figure to be at least 40,000 species. Although the highest estimates (up to 100 million species) have since been deprecated, estimates supported by rarefaction curves, together with the use of DNA barcoding and the increasing acknowledgment of widespread cryptic species among nematodes, have placed the figure closer to one million species.

Nematodes have successfully adapted to nearly every ecosystem: from marine (salt) to fresh water, soils, from the polar regions to the tropics, as well as the highest to the lowest of elevations. They are ubiquitous in freshwater, marine, and terrestrial environments, where they often outnumber other animals in both individual and species counts, and are found in locations as diverse as mountains, deserts, and oceanic trenches. They are found in every part of the Earth's lithosphere, even at great depths, 0.9–3.6 km (3,000–12,000 ft) below the surface of the Earth in gold mines in South Africa. They represent 90% of all animals on the ocean floor. In total, 4.4 × 10^{20} nematodes inhabit the Earth's topsoil, or approximately 60 billion for each human, with the highest densities observed in tundra and boreal forests. Their numerical dominance, often exceeding a million individuals per square meter and accounting for about 80% of all individual animals on Earth, their diversity of lifecycles, and their presence at various trophic levels point to an important role in many ecosystems. They play crucial roles in polar ecosystems. The roughly 2,271 genera are placed in 256 families. The many parasitic forms include pathogens in most plants and animals. A third of the genera occur as parasites of vertebrates; about 35 nematode species are human parasites.

== Etymology ==
The word nematode comes from the Modern Latin compound of nema- 'thread' (from Greek nema, genitive nematos 'thread', from the stem nein 'to spin'; cf. needle) + -odes 'like, of the nature of' (cf. -oid). The addition firstly of '-oid' and then to '-ode' renders 'threadlike'.

== Taxonomy and systematics ==
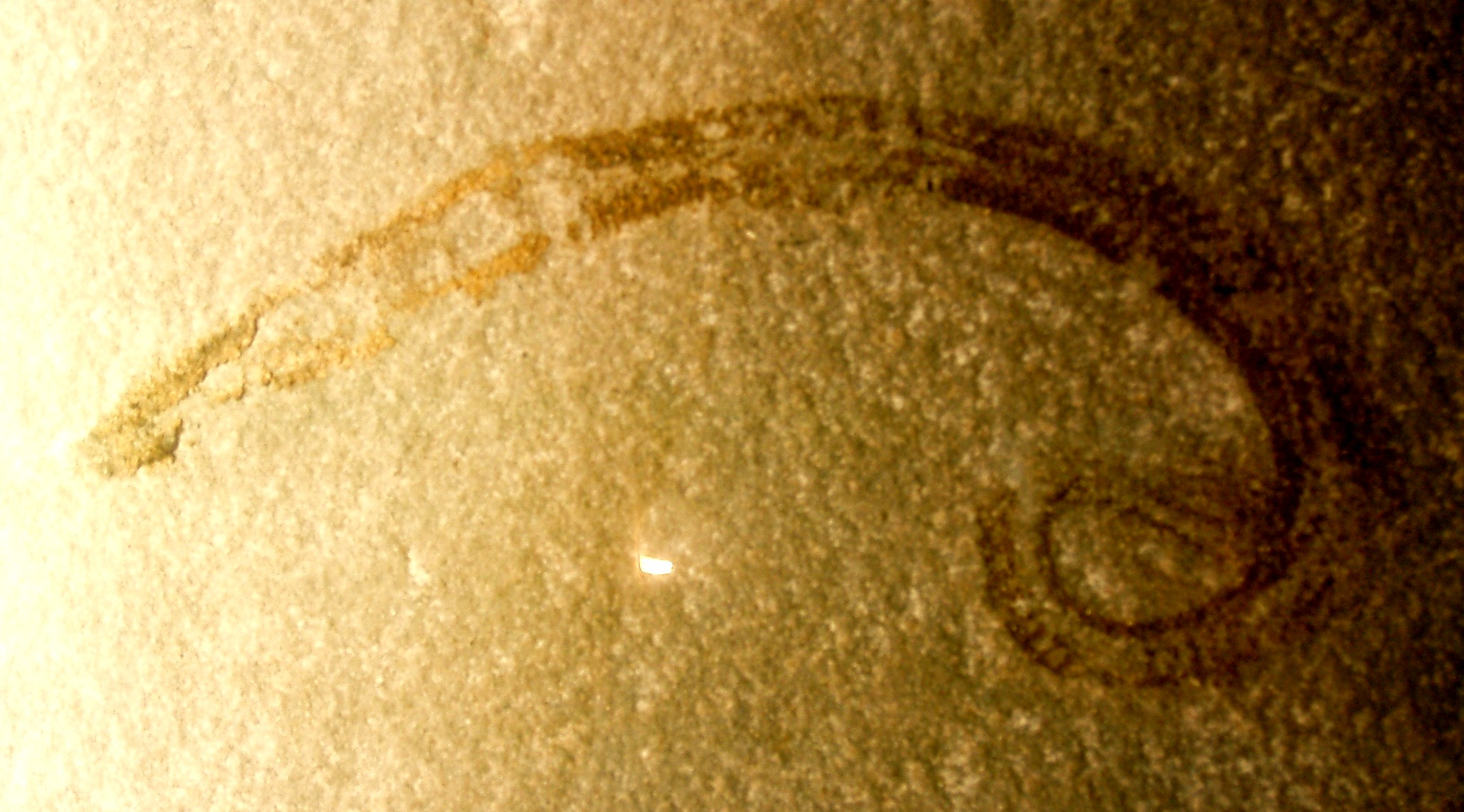
Eophasma jurasicum, a fossilized nematode

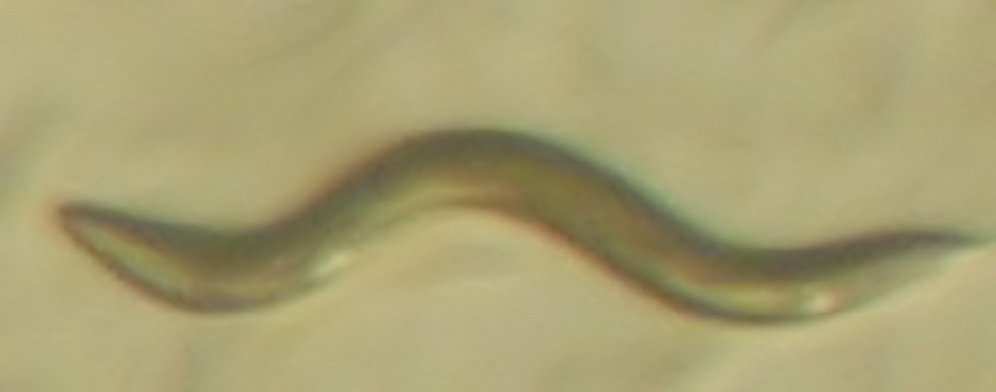
Caenorhabditis elegans

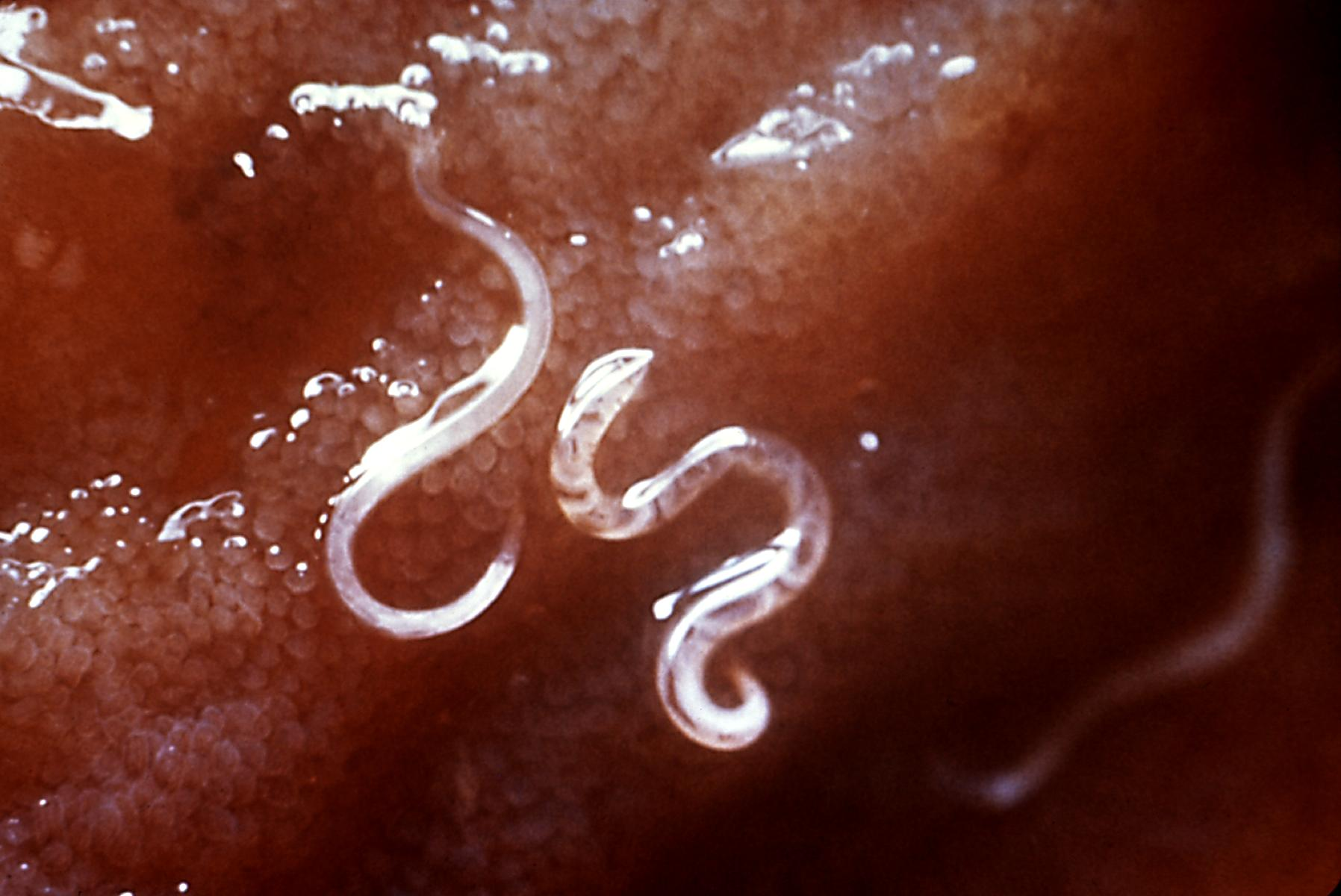
Rhabditia

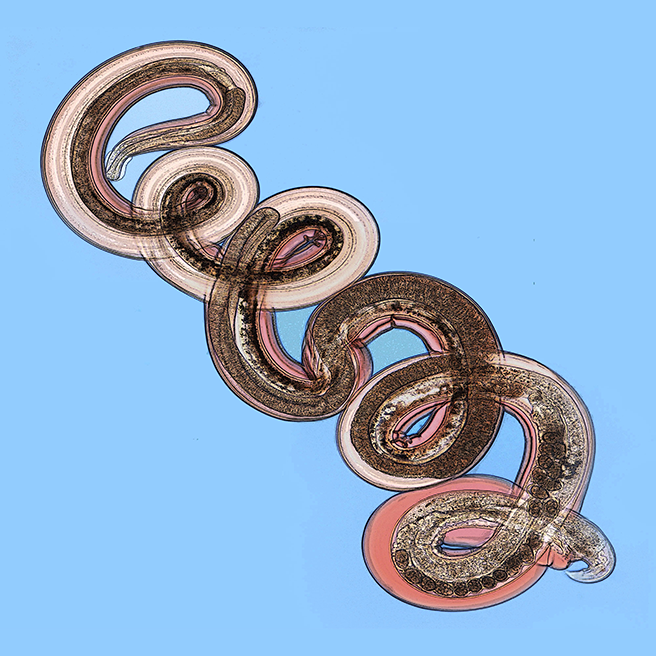
Nippostrongylus brasiliensis

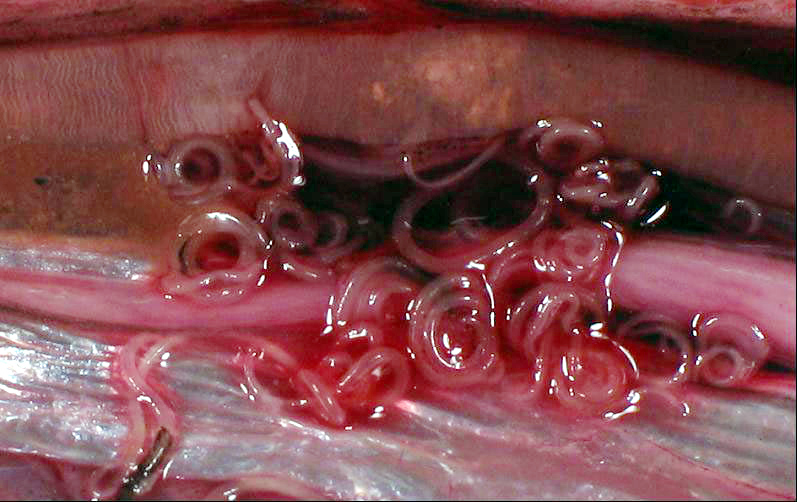
Unidentified Anisakidae (Ascaridina: Ascaridoidea)

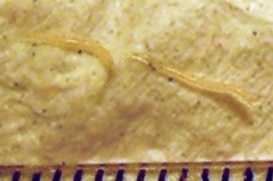
Oxyuridae Pinworm

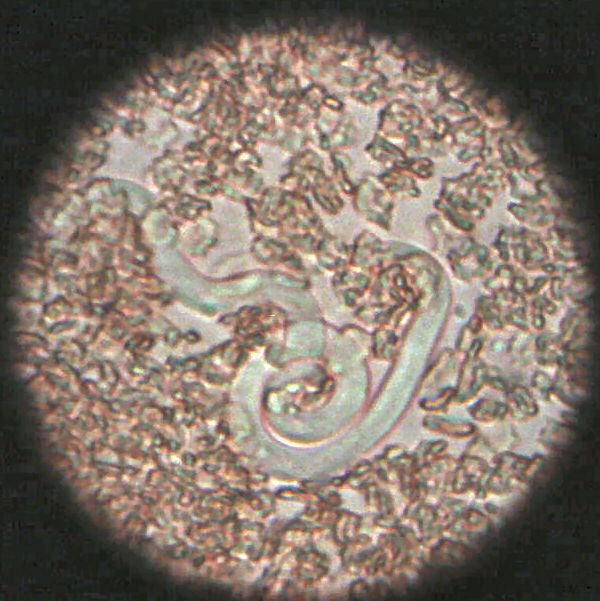
Spiruridae Dirofilaria immitis

=== History ===
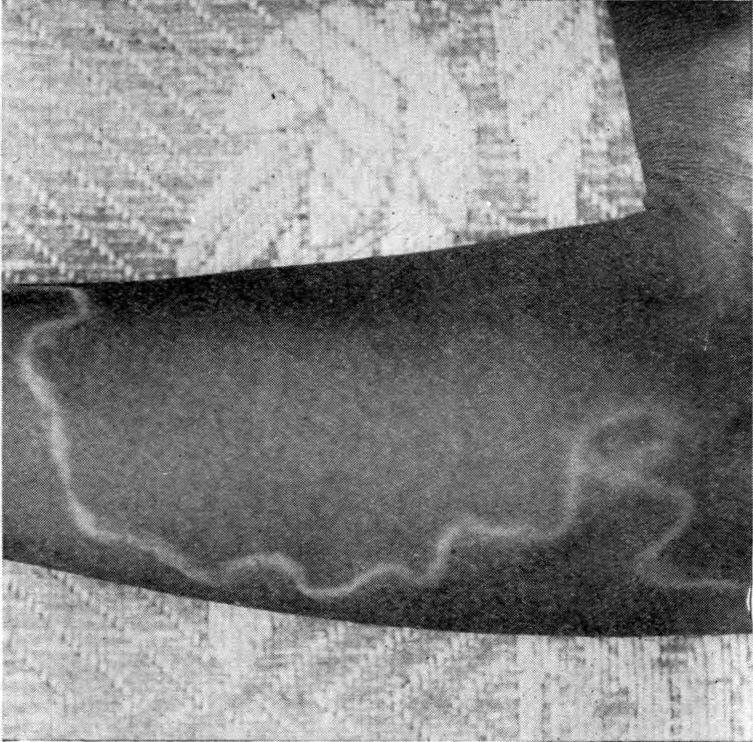
Carl Linnaeus described nematodes including the parasitic Dracunculus medinensis, seen here under a person's skin.

In 1758, Carl Linnaeus described nematodes of a few genera including Ascaris and Dracunculus, then included in the Vermes. The name of the group Nematoda, informally called "nematodes", came from Nematoidea, originally defined by Karl Rudolphi in 1808, from Ancient Greek νῆμα (nêma, nêmatos, 'thread') and -ειδής (-eidēs, 'species') (cf. native German Fadenwurm < Faden (yarn, thread) + Wurm, attested since the mid of 18th). It was treated as family Nematodes by Burmeister in 1837. At its origin, the "Nematoidea" erroneously included Nematodes and Nematomorpha, attributed by Karl Theodor Ernst von Siebold in 1843. Along with Acanthocephala, Trematoda, and Cestoidea, it formed the obsolete group Entozoa, created by Rudolphi in 1808. They were classed along with Acanthocephala in the obsolete phylum Nemathelminthes by Gegenbaur in 1859. In 1861, Karl Moriz Diesing treated the group as order Nematoda. In 1877, the taxon Nematoidea, including the family Gordiidae (horsehair worms), was promoted to the rank of phylum by Ray Lankester. The first clear distinction between the nemas and gordiids was realized by František Vejdovsky when he named the group containing the horsehair worms the order Nematomorpha in 1886.

In 1910, Grobben proposed the phylum Aschelminthes, and the nematodes were included as class Nematoda alongside the classes Rotifera, Gastrotricha, Kinorhyncha, Priapulida, and Nematomorpha.In 1919, Nathan Cobb proposed that nematodes should be recognized alone as a phylum. He argued they should be called "nema" in English rather than "nematodes" and defined the taxon Nemates (later emended as Nemata, Latin plural of nema), listing Nematoidea sensu restricto as a synonym. In 1932, Potts elevated the class Nematoda to the level of phylum, leaving the name the same. Although Potts' and Cobb's classifications are equivalent, both names are used, and Nematode became a popular term in zoological science. However, some authors continued to accept phylum Aschelminthes in the second half of the 20th century.

=== Phylogeny ===
The phylogenetic relationships of the nematodes and their close relatives among the protostomes are still discussed. Initially, some morphology-based phylogenetic classifications accepted Aschelmithes/Nemathelminthes as a legitimate group. In the 1990s, nematodes were proposed to form the group Ecdysozoa together with moulting animals, such as arthropods. The identity of the closest living relatives of the Nematoda has always been considered to be well resolved. Morphological and molecular phylogenetics agree with placing the roundworms as a sister taxon to the parasitic Nematomorpha; together, they make up the Nematoida. Along with the Scalidophora (formerly Cephalorhyncha), the Nematoida might form the clade Cycloneuralia, but much disagreement occurs both between and among the available morphological and molecular data. The Cycloneuralia or the Introverta—depending on the validity of the former—are often ranked as a superphylum. Recent molecular analyses have placed Nematoida closer to Panarthropoda than to Scalidophora, forming clade Cryptovermes with the former. However, a few studies have supported alternative hypotheses, grouping nematodes with Tardigrada or with Loricifera. Advancements in molecular phylogeny have also clarified the internal branchings of Nematoda.

=== Systematics ===
Due to the lack of knowledge regarding many nematodes, their systematics is contentious. An early and influential classification was proposed by Chitwood and Chitwood—later revised by Chitwood—who divided the phylum into two classes—Aphasmidia and Phasmidia. These were later renamed Adenophorea (gland bearers) and Secernentea (secretors), respectively. The Secernentea share several characteristics, including the presence of phasmids, a pair of sensory organs located in the lateral posterior region, and this was used as the basis for this division. This scheme was adhered to in many later classifications, though the Adenophorea were not in a uniform group.

Initial studies of incomplete DNA sequences suggested the existence of five clades:

- Dorylaimida
- Enoplia
- Spirurina
- Tylenchina
- Rhabditina

The Secernentea seem to be a natural group of close relatives, while the Adenophorea appear to be a paraphyletic assemblage of roundworms that retain a good number of ancestral traits. The old Enoplia do not seem to be monophyletic, either, but do contain two distinct lineages. The old group Chromadorea seems to be another paraphyletic assemblage, with the Monhysterida representing a very ancient minor group of nematodes. Among the Secernentea, the Diplogasteria may need to be united with the Rhabditia, while the Tylenchia might be paraphyletic with the Rhabditia.

The understanding of roundworm systematics and phylogeny as of 2002 is summarised below:

Phylum Nematoda

- Basal order Monhysterida
- Class Dorylaimida
- Class Enoplea
- Class Secernentea
  - Subclass Diplogasteria (disputed)
  - Subclass Rhabditia (paraphyletic?)
  - Subclass Spiruria
  - Subclass Tylenchia (disputed)
- "Chromadorea" assemblage

Later work has suggested the presence of 12 clades. In 2019, a study identified one conserved signature indel (CSI) found exclusively in members of the phylum Nematoda through comparative genetic analyses. The CSI consists of a single amino acid insertion within a conserved region of a Na(+)/H(+) exchange regulatory factor protein NRFL-1 and is a molecular marker that distinguishes the phylum from other species. An analysis of the mitochondrial DNA suggests that the following groupings are valid

- subclass Dorylaimia
- orders Rhabditida, Trichinellida and Mermithida
- suborder Rhabditina
- infraorders Spiruromorpha and Oxyuridomorpha

In 2022 a new classification of the entire phylum Nematoda was presented by M. Hodda. It was based on current molecular, developmental and morphological evidence. Under this classification, the classes and subclasses are:

- Class Enoplea
  - Subclass Enoplia
  - Subclass Oncholaimia
  - Subclass Triplonchia
- Class Dorylaimea
  - Subclass Dorylaimia
  - Subclass Bathyodontia
  - Subclass Trichocephalia
- Class Chromadorea
  - Subclass Chromadoria
  - Subclass Plectia

== Fossil record ==
Nematode eggs from the clades Ascaridina, Spirurina, and Trichocephalida have been discovered in coprolites from the Oligocene-aged Tremembé Formation, which represented a palaeolake in present-day São Paulo with a diverse fossil assemblage of birds, fish, and arthropods that lent itself to fostering high nematode diversity. Nematodes have also been found in various lagerstätten, such as Burmese amber, the Moltrasio Formation, and the Rhynie chert, where the earliest known fossils are known from.

== Anatomy ==
Internal anatomy of a male C. elegans nematode

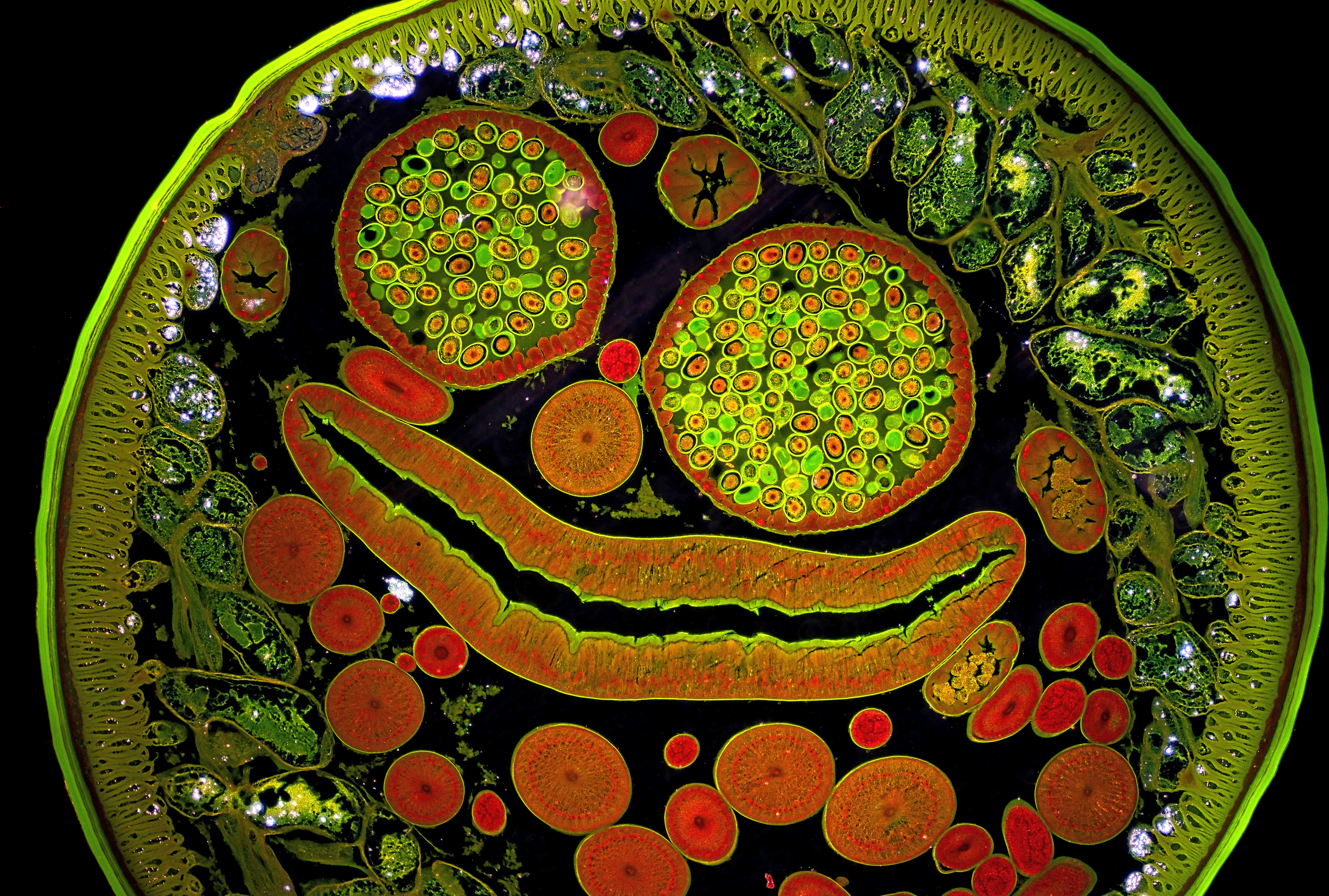
Cross-section of female Ascaris. The large circles filled with small green circles are the uterus and eggs. The long narrow feature is the digestive tract. The smaller red and orange circles are the ovaries and oviducts. The cluster of green and black blobs in the upper right and lower left are the nerve cords (ventral and dorsal). Surrounding the internal organs are the frilly green longitudinal muscles, the dark hypodermis, and the green outer cuticle.

Nematodes are very small, slender worms. Most are free-living, often less than 2.5 mm long and some only about 1 mm. Many nematodes are microscopic. Some soil nematodes can reach up to 7 mm in length, and some marine species can reach up to 5 cm. Some are parasitic and can reach lengths of 50 cm or more.

The body is often ornamented with ridges, rings, bristles, or other distinctive structures.

The head is relatively distinct. Whereas the rest of the body is bilaterally symmetrical, the head is radially symmetrical, with sensory bristles and, in many cases, solid 'head-shields' radiating outwards around the mouth. The mouth has either three or six lips, which often bear a series of teeth on their inner edges. An adhesive 'caudal gland' is often found at the tip of the tail. The epidermis is either a syncytium or a single layer of cells, and is covered by a thick collagenous cuticle. The cuticle is often of a complex structure and may have two or three distinct layers. Underneath the epidermis lies a layer of longitudinal muscle cells. The relatively rigid cuticle works with the muscles to create a hydroskeleton, as nematodes lack circumferential muscles. Projections run from the inner surface of muscle cells towards the nerve cords; this is a unique arrangement in the animal kingdom, in which nerve cells normally extend fibers into the muscles rather than vice versa.

=== Digestive system ===
The oral cavity is lined with cuticles, which are often strengthened with structures, such as ridges, especially in carnivorous species, which may bear several teeth. The mouth often includes a sharp stylet, which the animal can thrust into its prey. In some species, the stylet is hollow and can be used to suck liquids from plants or animals. The oral cavity opens into a muscular, sucking pharynx, also lined with cuticle. Digestive glands are found in this region of the gut, producing enzymes that start to break down the food. In stylet-bearing species, these may even be injected into the prey.

No stomach is present, with the pharynx connecting directly to a muscleless intestine that forms the main length of the gut. This produces further enzymes and also absorbs nutrients through its single-cell-thick lining. The last portion of the intestine is lined by a cuticle, forming a rectum, which expels waste through the anus just below and in front of the tip of the tail. The movement of food through the digestive system is the result of the body movements of the worm. The intestine has valves or sphincters at either end to help control food movement through the body.

=== Excretory system ===
Nitrogenous waste is excreted in the form of ammonia through the body wall, and is not associated with any specific organs. However, the structures for excreting salt to maintain osmoregulation are typically more complex.

There is an excretory gland, also known as a ventral cell, or renette cell in all species of Adenophorea. In Secernentia there is an excretory canal system that may or may not use a gland cell.

=== Nervous system ===
At the anterior end of the animal a dense, circular nerve ring which serves as the brain surrounds the pharynx. From this ring six labial papillary nerve cords extend anteriorly, while six nerve cords; a large ventral, a smaller dorsal and two pairs of sublateral cords extend posteriorly. Each nerve lies within a cord of connective tissue lying beneath the cuticle and between the muscle cells. The ventral nerve is the largest, and has a double structure forward of the excretory pore. The dorsal nerve is responsible for motor control, while the lateral nerves are sensory, and the ventral combines both functions.

The nervous system is the only place in the body that contains cilia; these are all nonmotile and with a sensory function.

The body is covered in numerous sensory bristles and papillae that together provide a sense of touch. Behind the sensory bristles on the head lie two small pits, or 'amphids'. These are well supplied with nerve cells and are probably chemoreception organs. A few aquatic nematodes possess what appear to be pigmented eye-spots, but whether or not these are actually sensory in nature is unclear.

== Reproduction ==
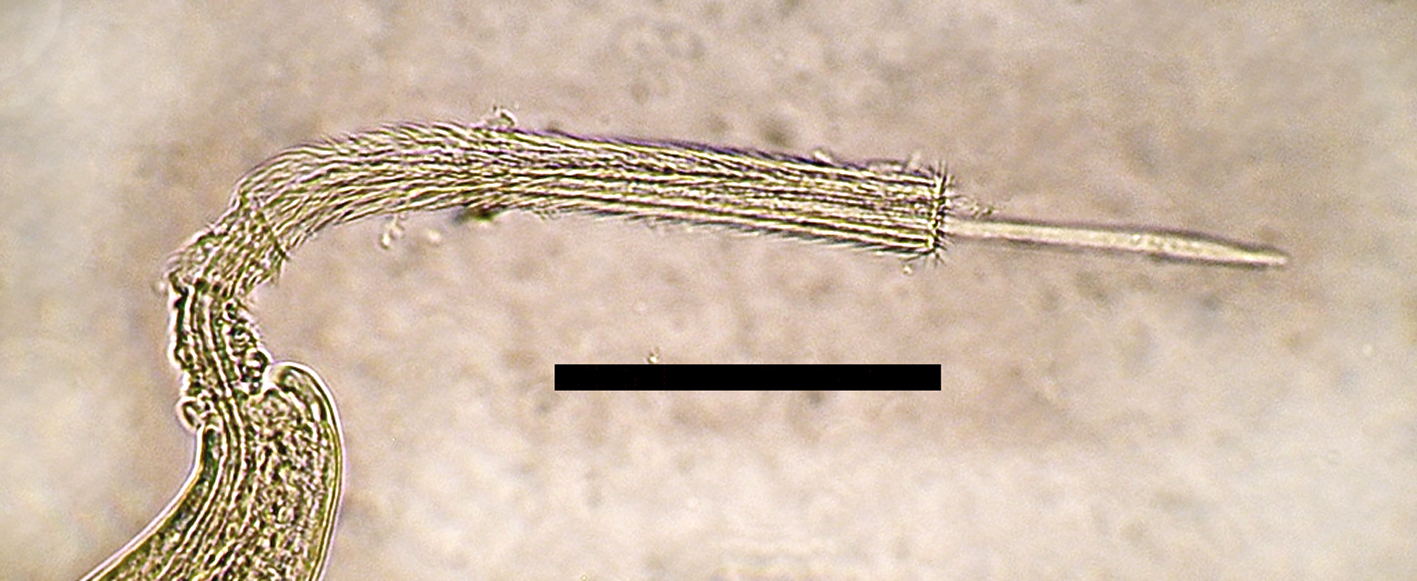
Extremity of a male nematode showing the spicule, used for copulation, bar=100 μm

Most nematode species are dioecious, with separate male and female individuals, though some, such as Caenorhabditis elegans, are androdioecious, consisting of hermaphrodites and rare males. Both sexes possess one or two tubular gonads. In males, the sperm are produced at the end of the gonad and migrate along its length as they mature. The testis opens into a relatively wide seminal vesicle and then during intercourse into a glandular and muscular ejaculatory duct associated with the vas deferens and cloaca. In females, the ovaries each open into an oviduct (in hermaphrodites, the eggs enter a spermatheca first) and then a glandular uterus. The uteri both open into a common vulva/vagina, usually located in the middle of the morphologically ventral surface.

Reproduction is usually sexual, though hermaphrodites are capable of self-fertilization. Males are usually smaller than females or hermaphrodites (often much smaller) and often have a characteristically bent or fan-shaped tail. During copulation, one or more chitinized spicules move out of the cloaca and are inserted into the genital pore of the female. Amoeboid sperm crawl along the spicule into the female worm. Nematode sperm is thought to be the only eukaryotic cell without the globular protein G-actin.

Eggs may be embryonated or unembryonated when passed by the female, meaning their fertilized eggs may not yet be developed. A few species are known to be ovoviviparous. The eggs are protected by an outer shell, secreted by the uterus. In free-living roundworms, the eggs hatch into larvae, which appear essentially identical to the adults, except for an underdeveloped reproductive system; in parasitic roundworms, the lifecycle is often much more complicated. The structure of the eggshell is complicated and includes several layers; a detailed anatomical and terminological framework has been proposed for these layers in 2023.

Nematodes as a whole possess a wide range of modes of reproduction. Some nematodes, such as Heterorhabditis spp., undergo a process called endotokia matricida: intrauterine birth causing maternal death. Some nematodes are hermaphroditic, and keep their self-fertilized eggs inside the uterus until they hatch. The juvenile nematodes then ingest the parent nematode. This process is significantly promoted in environments with a low food supply.

The nematode model species C. elegans, C. briggsae, and Pristionchus pacificus, among other species, exhibit androdioecy, which is otherwise very rare among animals. The single genus Meloidogyne (root-knot nematodes) exhibits a range of reproductive modes, including sexual reproduction, facultative sexuality (in which most, but not all, generations reproduce asexually), and both meiotic and mitotic parthenogenesis.

The genus Mesorhabditis exhibits an unusual form of parthenogenesis, in which sperm-producing males copulate with females, but the sperm do not fuse with the ovum. Contact with the sperm is essential for the ovum to begin dividing, but because no fusion of the cells occurs, the male contributes no genetic material to the offspring, which are essentially clones of the female.

== Aging ==
The nematode Caenorhabditis elegans is often used as a model organism for studying aging at the molecular level. For example, in C. elegans aging negatively impacts DNA repair, and mutants of C. elegans that are long-lived were shown to have increased DNA repair capability. These findings suggest a genetically determined correlation between DNA repair capacity and lifespan. In female C. elegans, germline processes that control DNA repair and formation of chromosomal crossovers during meiosis were shown to progressively deteriorate with age.

== Free-living species ==
Different free-living species feed on materials as varied as bacteria, algae, fungi, small animals, fecal matter, dead organisms, and living tissues. Free-living marine nematodes are important and abundant members of the meiobenthos. They play an important role in the decomposition process, aid in recycling of nutrients in marine environments, and are sensitive to changes in the environment caused by pollution. One roundworm of note, C. elegans, lives in the soil and has found much use as a model organism. C. elegans has had its entire genome sequenced, the developmental fate of every cell determined, and every neuron mapped.

== Parasitic species ==
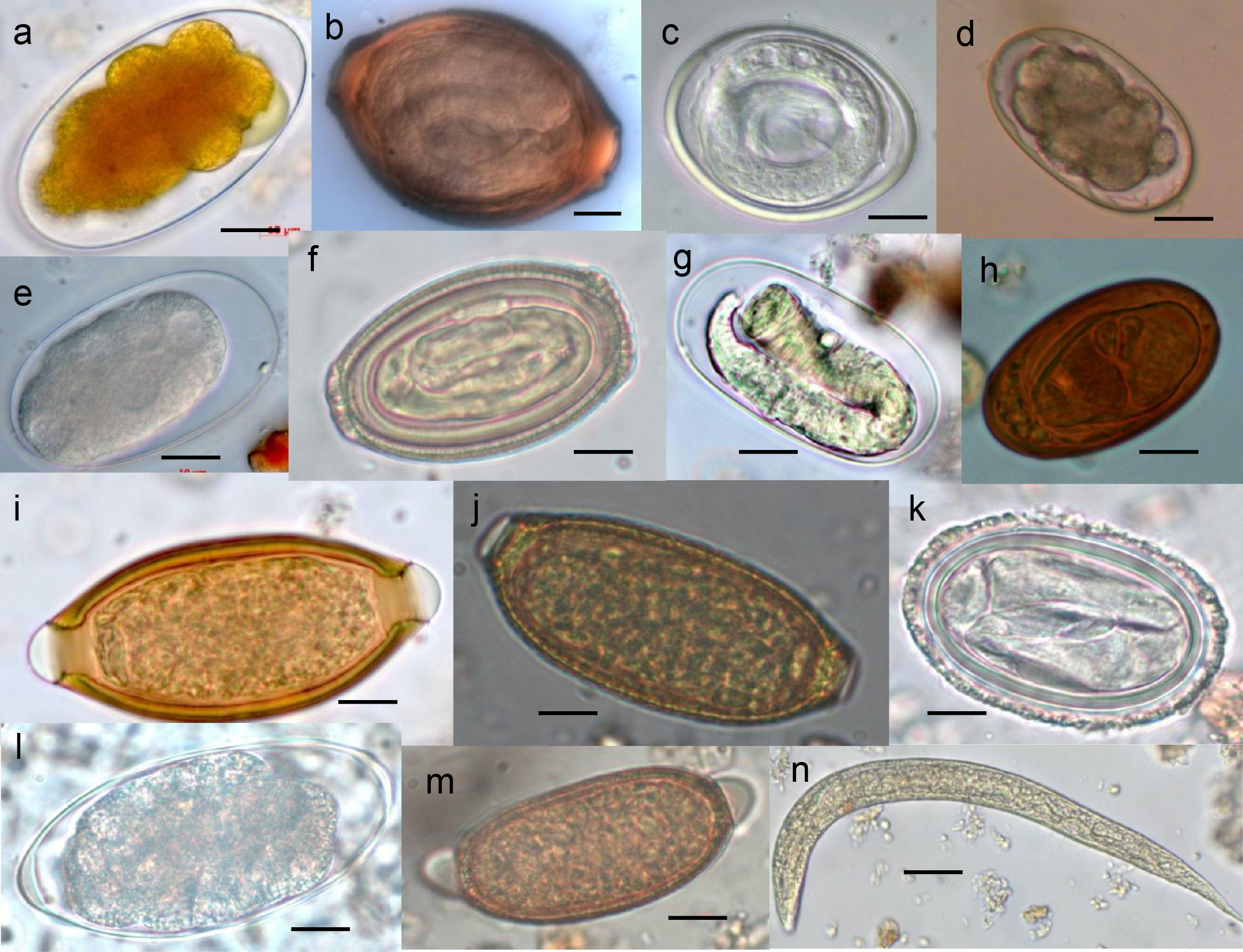
Fecal parasitic (mostly) nematodes from stools of Old World monkeys

Nematodes that commonly parasitise humans include ascarids (Ascaris), filarias, hookworms, pinworms (Enterobius), and whipworms (Trichuris trichiura). The species Trichinella spiralis, commonly known as the trichina worm, occurs in rats, pigs, bears, and humans, and is responsible for the disease trichinosis. Baylisascaris usually infests wild animals, but can be deadly to humans, as well. Dirofilaria immitis is known for causing heartworm disease by inhabiting the hearts, arteries, and lungs of dogs and some cats. Haemonchus contortus is one of the most abundant infectious agents in sheep around the world, causing great economic damage to sheep. In contrast, entomopathogenic nematodes parasitize insects and are mostly considered beneficial by humans, but some attack beneficial insects.

One form of nematode is entirely dependent upon fig wasps, which are the sole source of fig fertilization. They prey upon the wasps, riding them from the ripe fig of the wasp's birth to the fig flower of its death, where they kill the wasp, and their offspring await the birth of the next generation of wasps as the fig ripens.

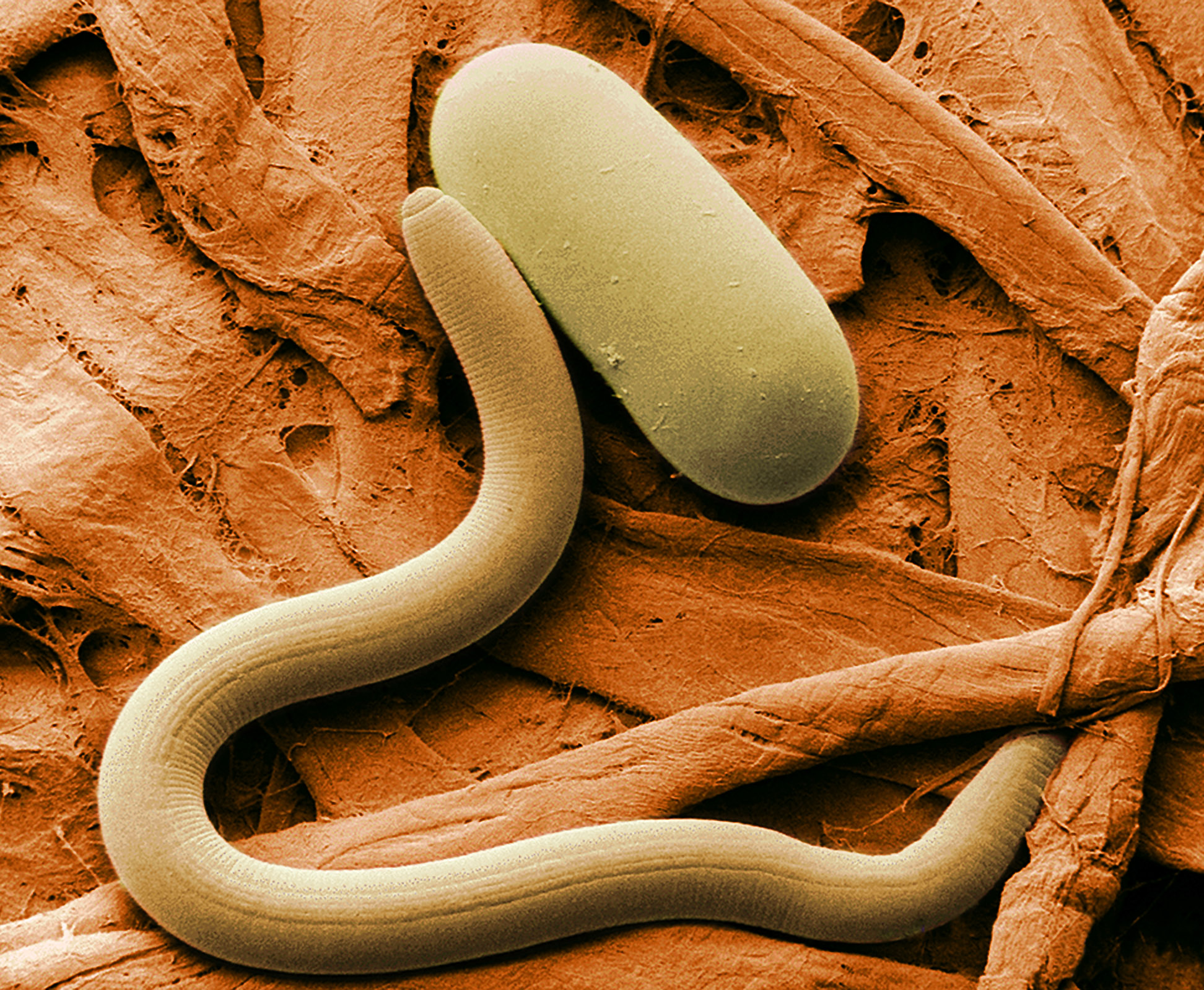
Colorized electron micrograph of soybean cyst nematode (Heterodera glycines) and egg

A parasitic tetradonematid nematode discovered in 2005, Myrmeconema neotropicum, induces fruit mimicry in the tropical ant Cephalotes atratus. Infected ants develop bright red gasters (abdomens), tend to be more sluggish, and walk with their gasters in a conspicuous elevated position. These changes likely cause frugivorous birds to confuse the infected ants for berries, and eat them. Parasite eggs passed in the bird's feces are subsequently collected by foraging C. atratus and are fed to their larvae, thus completing the lifecycle of M. neotropicum.

Similarly, multiple varieties of nematodes have been found in the abdominal cavities of the primitively social sweat bee, Lasioglossum zephyrus. Inside the female body, the nematode hinders ovarian development and renders the bee less active, thus less effective in pollen collection.

=== Agriculture and horticulture ===
Depending on its species, a nematode may be beneficial or detrimental to plant health. From agricultural and horticulture perspectives, the two categories of nematodes are the predatory ones, which kill garden pests; and the pest nematodes, which attack plants, or act as vectors spreading plant viruses between crop plants. Predatory nematodes include Phasmarhabditis hermaphrodita which is a lethal parasite of gastropods such as slugs and snails. Some members of the genus Steinernema such as Steinernema carpocapsae and Steinernema riobrave are generalist parasites of webworms, cutworms, armyworms, girdlers, some weevils, wood-borers and corn earworm moths. These organisms are grown commercially as biological pest control agents which can be used as an alternative to pesticides; their use is considered very safe. Plant-parasitic nematodes include several groups causing severe crop losses, taking 10% of crops worldwide every year. The most common genera are Aphelenchoides (foliar nematodes), Ditylenchus, Globodera (potato cyst nematodes), Heterodera (soybean cyst nematodes), Longidorus, Meloidogyne (root-knot nematodes), Nacobbus, Pratylenchus (lesion nematodes), Trichodorus, and Xiphinema (dagger nematodes). Several phytoparasitic nematode species cause histological damages to roots, including the formation of visible galls (e.g. by root-knot nematodes), which are useful characters for their diagnostic in the field. Some nematode species transmit plant viruses through their feeding activity on roots. One of them is Xiphinema index, vector of grapevine fanleaf virus, an important disease of grapes, another one is Xiphinema diversicaudatum, vector of arabis mosaic virus. Other nematodes attack bark and forest trees. The most important representative of this group is Bursaphelenchus xylophilus, the pine wood nematode, present in Asia and America and recently discovered in Europe. This nematode is transmitted from tree to tree by sawyer beetles (Monochamus).

Greenhouse growers use entomopathogenic nematodes as beneficial agents to control fungus gnats. The nematodes enter the larvae of the gnats by way of their anus, mouth, and spiracles (breathing pores) and then release bacteria which kills the gnat larvae. Commonly used nematode species to control pests on greenhouse crops include Steinernema feltiae for fungus gnats and western flower thrips, Steinernema carpocapsae used to control shore flies, Steinernema kraussei for control of black vine weevils, and Heterorhabditis bacteriophora to control beetle larvae.

Rotations of plants with nematode-resistant species or varieties is one means of managing parasitic nematode infestations. For example, planting Tagetes marigolds as a cover crop just prior to planting a nematode-susceptible plant, has been shown to suppress nematodes. Another approach involves using natural antagonists, particularly bacteria and fungi, which have proven effective in suppressing plant-parasitic nematodes, such as the fungus Gliocladium roseum. Chitosan, a natural biocontrol, elicits plant defense responses to destroy parasitic cyst nematodes on roots of soybean, maize, sugar beet, potato, and tomato crops without harming beneficial nematodes in the soil. Soil steaming is an efficient method to kill nematodes before planting a crop, but indiscriminately eliminates both harmful and beneficial soil fauna.

The golden nematode Globodera rostochiensis is a particularly harmful pest that has resulted in quarantines and crop failures worldwide. It can be controlled, however. CSIRO, the scientific research body of the Australian government, found a 13- to 14-fold reduction of nematode population densities in plots having Chinese mustard Brassica juncea green manure or seed meal in the soil.

=== Disease in humans ===
Disability-adjusted life year for intestinal nematode infections per 100,000 in 2002. < 25 25–50 50–75 75–100 100–120 120–140 140–160 160–180 180–200 200–220 220–240 > 240 no data

Anthelmintic effect of papain on Heligmosomoides bakeri

A number of pathogenic intestinal nematodes cause diseases in humans, including ascariasis, trichuriasis, and hookworm disease. Anisakis species parasitise fish and marine mammals and when consumed by humans can cause anisakiasis, a gastric or gastroallergic disease. Gastrointestinal nematode infections in humans are common, with approximately 50% of the global population being affected. Developing countries are most heavily impacted, in part due to lack of access to medical care.

Trichinosis starts in the intestines but larvae can migrate to muscle. Filarial nematodes cause filariases.

Toxocariasis is a zoonotic infection caused by roundworms passed from dogs, and sometimes cats. It can give rise to different types of larva migrans, such as visceral larva migrans and ocular larva migrans.

Studies have shown that parasitic nematodes infect American eels, causing damage to the eel's swim bladder, dairy animals like cattle and buffalo, and all species of sheep.

== Soil ecosystems ==
About 90% of nematodes reside in the top 15 cm (6") of soil. Nematodes do not decompose organic matter, but, instead, are parasitic and free-living organisms that feed on living material. Nematodes can effectively regulate bacterial population and community composition—they may eat up to 5,000 bacteria per minute. Also, nematodes can play an important role in the nitrogen cycle by way of nitrogen mineralization. But plant parasitic nematodes cause billions of dollars in annual crop damage worldwide.

One group of carnivorous fungi, the nematophagous fungi, are predators of soil nematodes. They can set enticements for the nematodes in the form of lassos or adhesive structures. They can also release powerful toxins when in contact with nematodes.

== Survivability ==
The nematode Caenorhabditis elegans an important model organism, was used as part of an ongoing research project conducted on the 2003 Space Shuttle Columbia mission STS-107, and survived the re-entry breakup. It is believed to be the first known species to survive a virtually unprotected atmospheric descent to Earth's surface. The Antarctic nematode Panagrolaimus davidi was able to withstand intracellular freezing depending on how well it had been fed. In 2023 an individual of Panagrolaimus kolymaensis was revived after 46,000 years in Siberian permafrost.

== See also ==
- Biological pest control – Controlling pests using other organisms
- List of organic gardening and farming topics – Overview of and topical guide to organic gardening and farming
- List of parasites of humans
- Nematode.net
- Soil food web
- Worm bagging – Form of pathological egg retention observed in nematodes
