= Löffler =

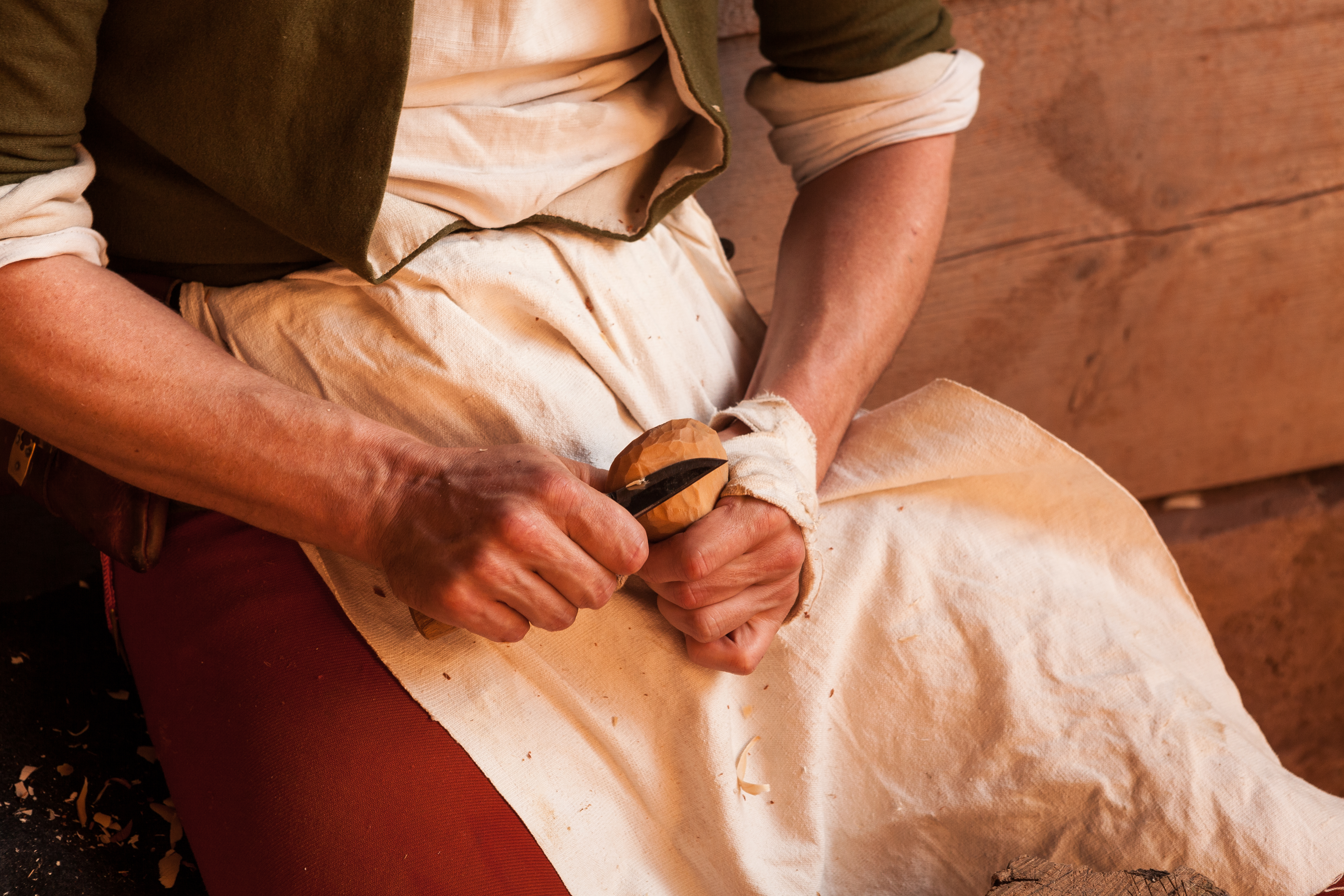
A spoon-carver

Löffler (literally "Spooner") is a German language surname. It is often anglicised as Loeffler. In most cases, the name originates from people who produced and/or traded spoons (German: Löffel). Notable people with the surname include:

- Anna Seelig-Löffler (born 1944), Swiss chemist
- August Löffler (1822–1866), German painter
- Charles Martin Loeffler (1861–1935), German-born American composer
- Cullen Loeffler (born 1981), American football player
- Diane Loeffler (1953–2019), American politician from Minnesota
- Douglas Loeffler (1932–2025), American politician from Florida
- Emanuel Löffler (1901–1986), Czech gymnast
- Frank Löffler (born 1980), German ski jumper
- Friedrich Loeffler (1852–1915), German bacteriologist
- Gerold Löffler, Swiss bobsledder
- James Loeffler, American historian of modern Jewish history
- Karl Löffler, head of the Jewish Affairs department of the Gestapo in Cologne, Germany during the 1930s and 1940s
- Kelly Loeffler (born 1970), American businesswoman and politician
- Ken Loeffler (1902–1975), American basketball coach
- Leopold Loeffler (1827–1898), Polish painter
- Louis R. Loeffler (1897–1972), American film editor
- Louise Loeffler, Belgian chess master
- Margot Klestil-Löffler (born 1954), Austrian diplomat
- Pete Loeffler (born 1976), American guitarist and singer
- Scot Loeffler (born 1974), American football coach
- Tom Loeffler (born 1946), American politician from Texas
- Wilhelm Löffler (fencer) (born 1886), German fencer
- Wilhelm Löffler (medical doctor) (1887–1972), Swiss physician

== See also ==
- Löffler's syndrome
- Loeffler endocarditis
