= Acute eosinophilic pneumonia =

- Other names: Idiopathic acute eosinophilic pneumonia
- Chest radiograph on admission
- Specialty: Pulmonology
- Symptoms: Fever, cough, dyspnea, pleuritic chest pain, myalgia, night sweats
- Complications: Acute respiratory failure, acute respiratory distress syndrome
- Usual onset: Acute; usually within 7 days
- Causes: Idiopathic; associated with smoking, inhaled substances, medications, and infections
- Risk factors: Recent initiation or change in smoking habits; inhalational exposures
- Diagnostic method: Chest imaging, bronchoalveolar lavage, exclusion of alternative causes
- Differential diagnosis: Acute respiratory distress syndrome, infectious pneumonia, other eosinophilic lung diseases
- Prevention: Avoidance of identified triggering exposures
- Treatment: Glucocorticoids; supportive respiratory care
- Medication: Prednisone, methylprednisolone
- Prognosis: Generally favourable with prompt treatment
- Frequency: Rare; incidence is not well established

Acute eosinophilic pneumonia (AEP) is an uncommon, acute-onset form of eosinophilic lung disease which varies in severity. Eosinophilic lung diseases are a group of diseases caused by damage to the alveolar sacs and surrounding tissues of the inner lung. Although not fully understood, the mechanisms underlying AEP may differ depending on its cause, which can include smoking, inhalational exposures, medications, and infections. In most patients, AEP is an idiopathic disease, with no known cause. Eosinophilic pneumonia can be acute or chronic.

AEP is characterized by airway injury, vascular injury, and the release of IL-33, a pro-inflammatory cytokine. This results in the migration and accumulation of eosinophils, a type of white blood cell, in the lungs, leading to inflammation and associated symptoms. Symptoms are nonspecific and include cough, shortness of breath, malaise, myalgia, night sweats, and pleuritic chest pain.

== Signs and Symptoms ==
Acute eosinophilic pneumonia typically presents with an acute onset of respiratory symptoms, including shortness of breath, cough, and pleuritic chest pain (chest pain that worsens with breathing). Systemic symptoms may include moderate fever, muscle aches (myalgia), night sweats, and abdominal pain.

In some cases, the disease can progress to acute respiratory distress syndrome (ARDS) and severe hypoxemic respiratory failure, potentially requiring mechanical ventilation. Patients commonly require hospitalization within seven days to one month after symptom onset. ARDS without an identifiable cause may also prompt consideration of AEP.

== Pathogenesis ==
The causes and pathogenesis of AEP remain poorly understood, but it has been hypothesized that various inhaled antigens are risk factors. Thus, risk factors for AEP include smoking tobacco (recently initiating smoking, reintroducing smoking after a break, or changing smoking patterns), vaping with electronic cigarettes, adding flavors to inhaled substances, large-scale smoking, second-hand smoke exposure, and inhalation of oils. Other environmental risk factors include inhaling parasites, fungi, viruses, spiders, and exposure to certain drugs like heroin and over-the-counter medications.

A proposed model of AEP pathogenesis suggests that these antigens cause airway damage, leading to the release of IL-33 and the recruitment of eosinophils. This leads to a hypersensitivity reaction, a type of inflammatory process, causing clinical symptoms. IL-5 from this process is also responsible for eosinophil differentiation, allowing for the development of drugs that target these specific receptors to reduce AEP symptoms.

== Diagnosis ==
Diagnosis of AEP involves obtaining a detailed medical history, with particular attention to smoking, environmental exposures, medication use, and a history of asthma.

Although AEP is often diagnosed by excluding other causes of pulmonary eosinophilia, several clinical, radiological, and laboratory criteria support its diagnosis. These include an acute febrile illness, with fever developing within one month before presentation and usually within seven days; bilateral diffuse opacities on chest imaging; and impaired oxygenation, indicated by a PaO₂ of 60 mmHg or less, a PaO₂/FiO₂ ratio of 300 mmHg or less, or an oxygen saturation below 90% on room air. In addition, bronchoalveolar lavage (BAL) fluid must contain at least 25% eosinophils on differential cell count, or a lung biopsy must demonstrate eosinophilic pneumonia. Other known causes of pulmonary eosinophilia, such as infections and drug exposures, must also be excluded. Recent initiation of smoking or exposure to inhaled dust may be present.

Chest CT showing multifocal opacities and small pleural effusions.

Imaging: High-resolution computed tomography (HRCT) is commonly used to assess pulmonary involvement in eosinophilic pneumonia. In AEP, imaging may show patchy ground-glass opacities, areas of consolidation, and bilateral pleural effusions. Chronic eosinophilic pneumonia (CEP), in contrast, is more commonly associated with peripheral pulmonary opacities.

Laboratory investigations: Blood tests may show leukocytosis, while peripheral blood eosinophilia may be absent initially and develop during the first seven days after presentation. BAL fluid typically contains at least 25% eosinophils, although this proportion may be lower in patients who have received corticosteroids before bronchoscopy. Increased interleukin-5 (IL-5) levels may also be observed. Pleural fluid obtained through thoracentesis may show an increased eosinophil count. Pulmonary function tests may demonstrate a restrictive ventilatory pattern, reduced diffusing capacity for carbon monoxide (DLCO), and an increased alveolar-arterial oxygen gradient.

Pathology: Lung biopsy is not routinely required to establish the diagnosis but may provide additional evidence. Histopathological examination may reveal edema and eosinophilic infiltration of the bronchial walls, pulmonary interstitium, and alveolar spaces. Diffuse alveolar damage, including the formation of hyaline membranes and fibroblast proliferation, may also be observed.

Differential diagnosis: Conditions considered in the differential diagnosis of AEP include chronic eosinophilic pneumonia (CEP), Löffler's syndrome (simple pulmonary eosinophilia), allergic bronchopulmonary aspergillosis (ABPA), drug-induced eosinophilic pneumonia, and eosinophilic lung diseases associated with parasitic or fungal infections. Other considerations include hypereosinophilic syndrome and eosinophilic granulomatosis with polyangiitis (EGPA), formerly known as Churg–Strauss syndrome. Interstitial and other pulmonary disorders that may present with overlapping findings include acute respiratory distress syndrome (ARDS), cryptogenic organizing pneumonia (COP), pulmonary Langerhans cell histiocytosis (PLCH), idiopathic pulmonary fibrosis, sarcoidosis, and desquamative interstitial pneumonia (DIP).

== Treatment ==
Corticosteroids are the first-line treatment for patients with AEP. Patients typically improve within 48 hours of treatment, and their chest imaging shows dramatic improvement within one month. Dosage depends on the severity of the disease progression. Patients with respiratory failure require high-dose IV methylprednisolone and are switched to oral prednisone upon clinical improvement, continued for 2–4 weeks and tapered over several weeks. Most patients with mild symptoms are started on oral prednisone for two weeks and tapered off. When applicable, patients should be counseled to quit smoking and avoid exposure to the offending agent to reduce recurrence of AEP. Relapse of disease is rare.

== History ==
AEP was first described in 1989 by Allen, Pacht, Gadek, and Davis, with eight proposed diagnostic criteria. These criteria included: acute febrile illness, hypoxemia, pulmonary infiltrates on imaging, alveolar eosinophils, exclusion of infection, absence of asthma, a quick response to steroids, and resolution of disease with no long-term effects.

== Epidemiology ==
As of 2018, approximately 400 cases of AEP have been reported with an estimated incidence of 9.1 to 11 per 100,000 person-years. It occurs most commonly in men aged 20–40, smokers, and those with no history of asthma. The number of cases peaks during the summer, with increasing disease severity.

== Future Research Directions ==
More research is required on the details of the pathogenesis of AEP, as it is still incompletely understood. Although there is a clear role of eosinophils in AEP, the mechanisms of damage to the lung tissues are yet to be discovered. Also, while there is a link between cigarette smoking and AEP, the number of cases of AEP compared to cigarette smokers is relatively low, indicating a possible genetic component of AEP, which requires further research into how genes may play a role in the development of AEP.
