= Serpiginous =

Progressive disease

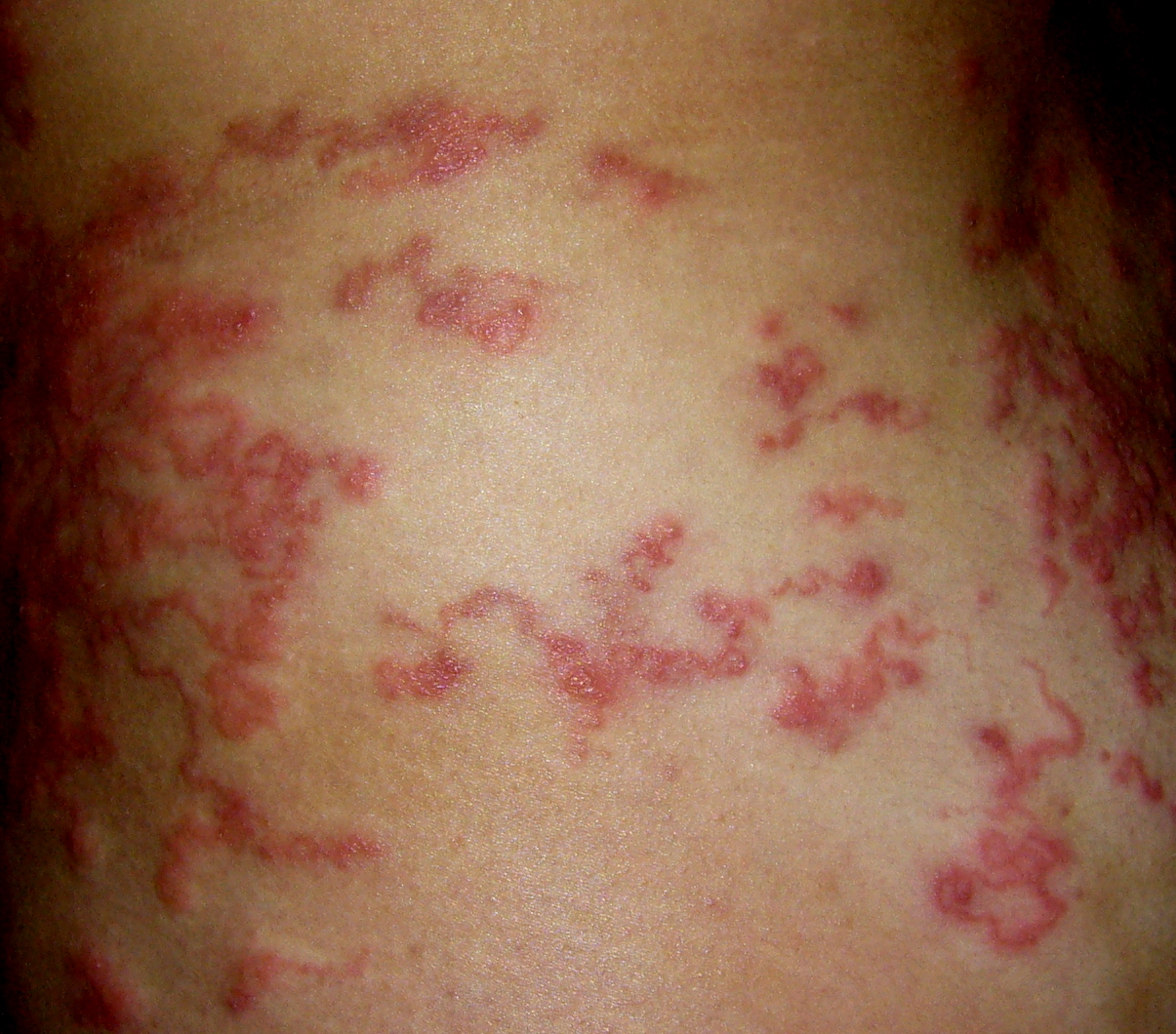
Serpiginous rash in cutaneous larvae migrans

Serpiginous, first known to be used in the 15th century, is a term from Latin serpere (“to creep”), usually referring to a creeping, snakelike or slowly progressive skin disease.

It is used to describe the rash in cutaneous larvae migrans, erythema annulare centrifugum, cutaneous pili migrans, purpura annularis telangiectoides, ringworm, balanitis circinata, and some cases of bullous pemphigoid.

It is also used to describe serpiginous choroiditis, a rare eye condition in which irregularly shaped (serpiginous) lesions are seen in two layers of the eye surface (the choriocapillaris and the retinal pigment epithelium).
