= Annular erythema of infancy =

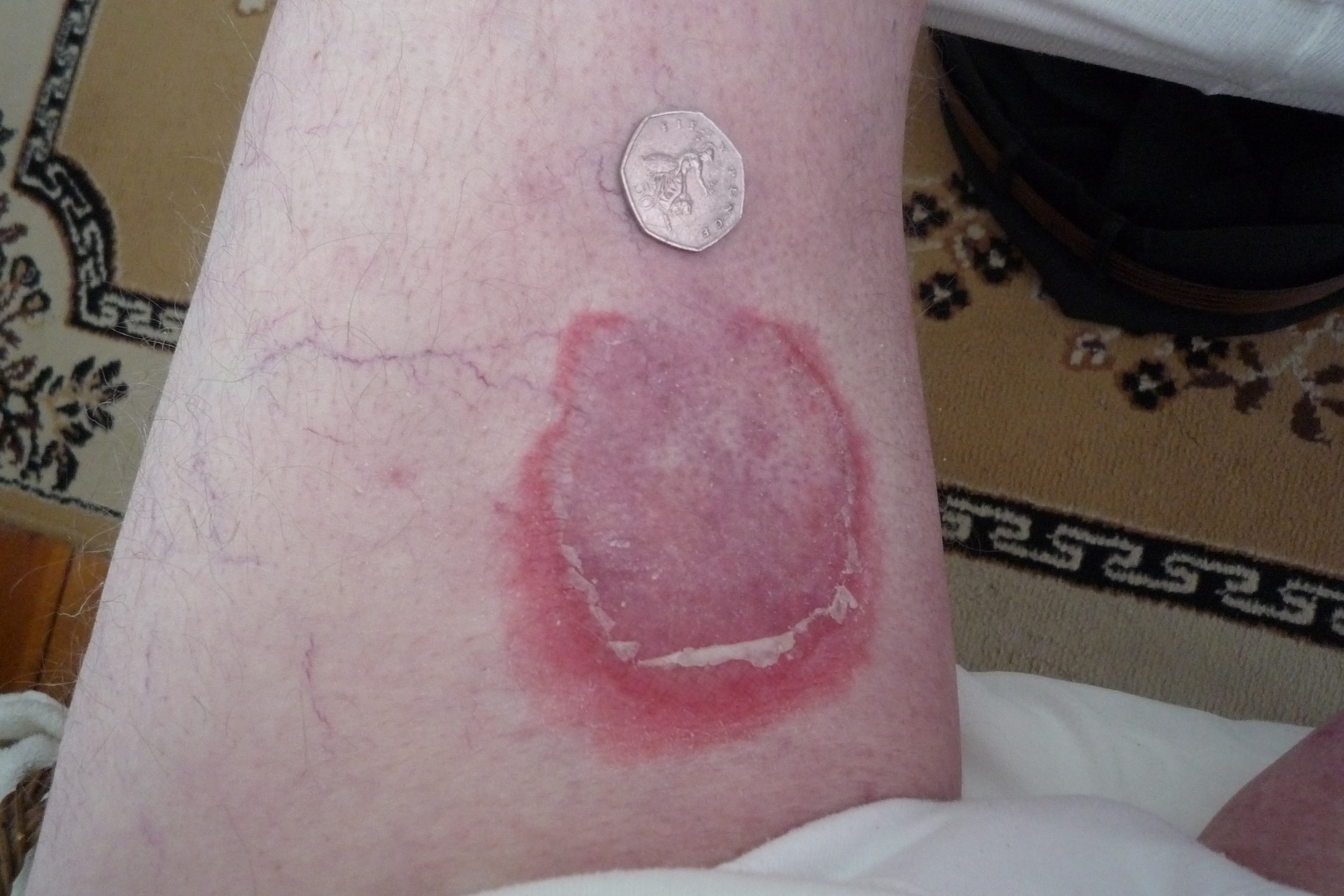
- Erythema annulare centrifugum.
- Specialty: Dermatology

Annular erythema of infancy (AEI) consists of self-limited eruptions of erythematous, annular to polycyclic patches and plaques. It is an idiopathic figurate erythema. Over several days, a single lesion disappears without leaving behind any scale or hyperpigmentation. Mostly affecting the trunk, face, and extremities, this rash has no symptoms. The diagnosis of AEI is made through a combination of histopathologic and clinical examinations. The disease first manifests in infancy, and if treatment is not received, the periodic eruptions usually stop after the first year of life.

== Signs and symptoms ==
Urticarial papules or slowly growing, raised-bordered annular or circinate erythematous plaques are found upon physical examination. Lesions are located on the face, trunk, and extremities, and the condition is asymptomatic. Individual lesions heal in a few days however, new ones keep coming up until the skin fully clears up, which happens at about a year of age. At that point, the skin looks completely normal.

== Causes ==
Although the exact cause of AEI is unknown, a hypersensitivity reaction to an unidentified antigen is believed to be involved.

== Diagnosis ==
Histologic findings include perivascular lymphocyte infiltrates and either neutrophils or eosinophils; they are nonspecific.

== See also ==
- List of cutaneous conditions
- Erythema annulare centrifugum
