= Tropical pulmonary eosinophilia =

- Other names: Weingarten's syndrome
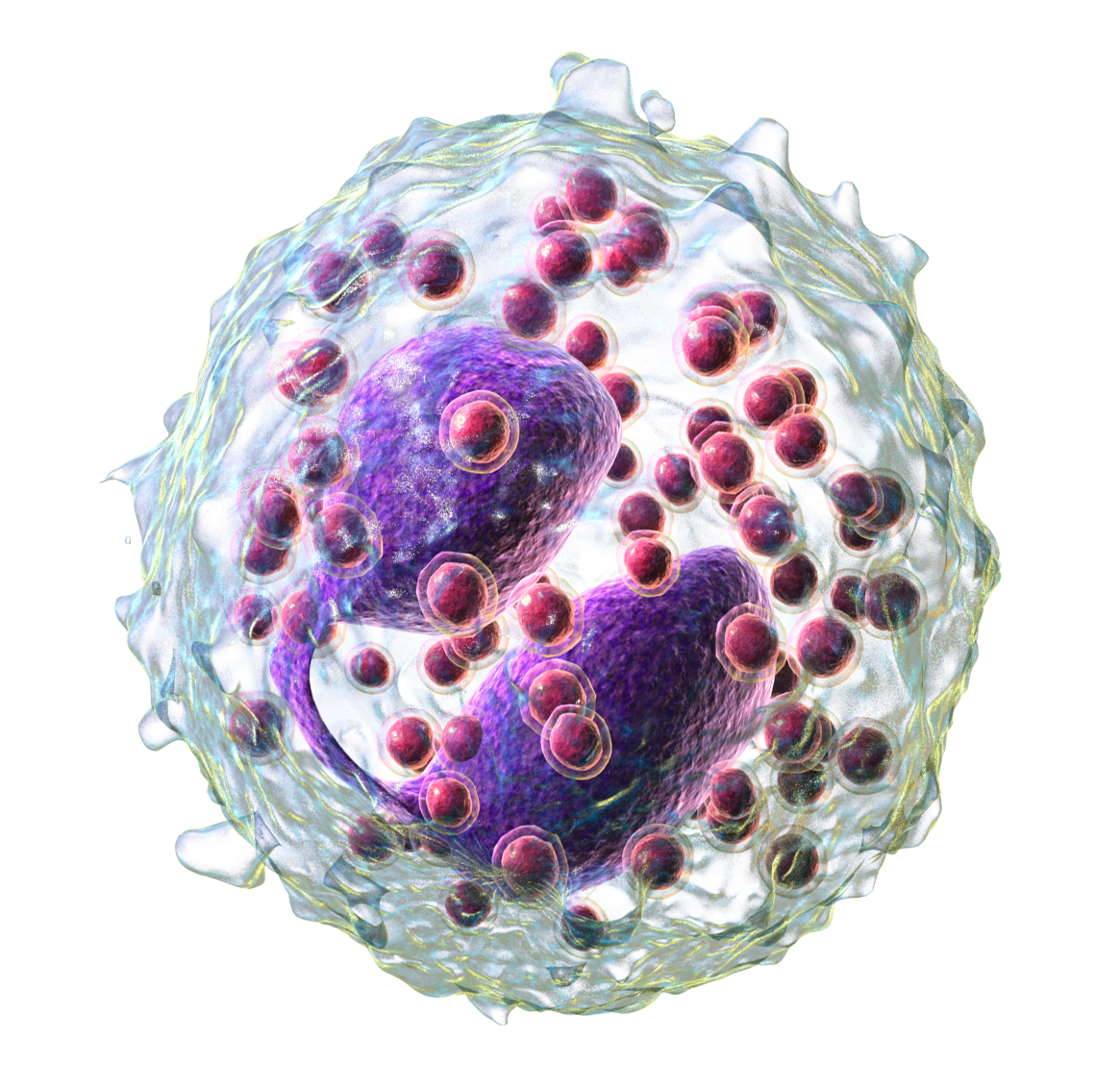
- Eosinophil
- Specialty: Respirology

Tropical pulmonary eosinophilia (TPE, tropical eosinophilia, or Weingarten's syndrome) is characterized by cough, bronchospasm, wheezing, abdominal pain, and an enlarged spleen. Occurring most frequently in the Indian subcontinent and Southeast Asia, TPE is a clinical manifestation of lymphatic filariasis, a parasitic infection caused by filarial roundworms that inhabit the lymphatic vessels, lymph nodes, spleen, and bloodstream. Three species of filarial roundworms, all from the Onchocercidae family, cause human lymphatic filariasis: Wuchereria bancrofti, Brugia malayi, and Brugia timori.

Tropical pulmonary eosinophilia is a rare syndrome characterised by pulmonary interstitial infiltrates and marked peripheral eosinophilia. This condition is more widely recognised and promptly diagnosed in filariasis-endemic regions, such as the Indian subcontinent, Africa, Asia and South America. In nonendemic countries, patients are commonly thought to have bronchial asthma. Chronic symptoms may delay the diagnosis by up to five years. Early recognition and treatment with the antifilarial drug, diethylcarbamazine, is important, as delay before treatment may lead to progressive interstitial fibrosis and irreversible impairment.

The condition of marked eosinophilia with pulmonary involvement was first termed tropical pulmonary eosinophilia in 1950. The syndrome is caused by a distinct hypersensitive immunological reaction to microfilariae of W. bancrofti and Brugia malayi. However, only a small percentage (< 0.5%) of the 130 million people globally who are infected with filariasis apparently develop this reaction. The clearance of rapidly opsonised microfilariae from the bloodstream results in a hypersensitive immunological process and abnormal recruitment of eosinophils, as reflected by extremely high IgE levels of over 1000 kU/L. The typical patient is a young adult man from the Indian subcontinent.

== Symptoms and signs ==
A persistent or recurrent cough that is aggravated at night, along with fatigue, weight loss and a low-grade fever in an individual who has lived or traveled in an area where filariasis is endemic suggests the diagnosis of this disease. Some people with this disease may also have enlarged lymph nodes in the neck, axillae or inguinal areas. Others may have a cough productive of bloody sputum and may also have a wheeze.

== Diagnosis ==
The diagnostic criteria for TPE include:

- a history supportive of exposure to lymphatic filariasis;
- a peripheral eosinophil count greater than 3 billion/L);
- an elevated serum IgE levels (> 1000 kU/L);
- increased titers of antifilarial antibodies;
- peripheral blood negative for microfilariae; and
- a clinical response to diethylcarbamazine.

High antifilarial IgG titers to microfilariae often result in cross reactivity with other nonfilarial helminth antigens, such as Strongyloides and Schistosoma antigens, as demonstrated in reported cases. It is important to exclude other parasitic infections before TPE is diagnosed, by serological tests, examination of stool specimens in a laboratory experienced in parasitic infections, or a trial of anthelmintic medication. Other parasitic infections, such as the zoonotic filariae, dirofilariasis, ascariasis, strongyloidiasis, visceral larva migrans and hookworm disease, may also be confused with TPE because of overlapping clinical features, serological profile and response to diethylcarbamazine. Radiological findings are nonspecific, with normal appearance on chest X-ray in up to 20% of patients. Lung biopsy is not part of the routine diagnostic workup of tropical pulmonary eosinophilia.

== Treatment ==
The dramatic response to diethylcarbamazine, a commonly used drug for filariasis, almost confirms the diagnosis. No universal treatment guidelines have been established for tropical pulmonary eosinophilia. The antifilarial diethylcarbamazine (6 mg/kg/day in three divided doses for 21 days remains the main therapeutic agent, and is generally well tolerated. Reported side effects include headache, fever, pruritus and gastrointestinal upset. The eosinophil count often falls dramatically within 7–10 days of starting treatment.

== See also ==
- Eosinophilic pneumonia
- Löffler's syndrome
- Parasitic pneumonia
