= Thomas Fox (dermatologist) =

English cricketer and dermatologist

Personal information
- Full name: Thomas Colcott Fox
- Born: 13 June 1849; Broughton, Hampshire, England
- Died: 11 April 1916 (aged 66); Westminster, London, England
- Batting: Right-handed
- Bowling: Unknown

Domestic team information
- Years: Team
- 1875: Hampshire

Career statistics
| Competition | First-class |
|---|---|
| Matches | 2 |
| Runs scored | 10 |
| Batting average | 2.50 |
| 100s/50s | –/– |
| Top score | 7 |
| Balls bowled | 28 |
| Wickets | – |
| Bowling average | – |
| 5 wickets in innings | – |
| 10 wickets in match | – |
| Best bowling | – |
| Catches/stumpings | 1/– |
- Source: Cricinfo, 28 December 2009

Thomas Colcott Fox (13 June 1849 – 11 April 1916) was an English first-class cricketer and dermatologist.

== Early life and career ==
The eighth son of physician Luther Owen Fox, Thomas Fox was born in June 1849 at Broughton, Hampshire. He was educated at both Queenwood College and University College School, before matriculating to Peterhouse, Cambridge. In graduated in 1872, before going onto further his studies in medicine at Queens' College, Cambridge and the University of London, obtaining his Membership of the Royal Colleges of Surgeons in 1876. It was during his medical studies that Fox played first-class cricket for Hampshire in 1875, against Kent at Catford, and Sussex at Hove. He scored 10 runs in these two matches, and bowled seven wicketless overs.

== Career ==
One of Fox's earliest medical appointment was as medical superintendent at the Fulham Smallpox Hospital. Having obtained his MRCP in 1883, Fox was elected a fellow in 1892.

He later specialised in and gained prominence as a dermatologist, becoming physician for diseases of the skin at Westminster Hospital and visiting dermatologist for the Ringworm School of the Metropolitan Asylums Board. He held additional positions at the Victoria Hospital for Children and the St. George and St. James's Dispensary, and was a consultant physician to the skin department at the Paddington Green Children's Hospital. Alongside his brother, William Tilbury Fox, he authored the Epitome of Skin Diseases in 1876, as well as contributing dermatology articles to publications, including Allbutt's System of Medicine. The standard author abbreviation Fox is used to indicate this person as the author when citing a botanical name. In 1889 he introduced the term figurate erythema. It was noted in his obituary in The Lancet that "he influenced British dermatology more powerfully than any of his contemporaries". He had married the Scotswoman Ida Mary Hay-Newton in 1890. In later life, he was disabled by illness and spent the last years of his life in retirement.

== Death ==
Fox died at Westminster on 11 April 1916.
