= Eosinophilic pneumonia =

Accumulation of eosinophil cells in the lungs

- Specialty: Respirology

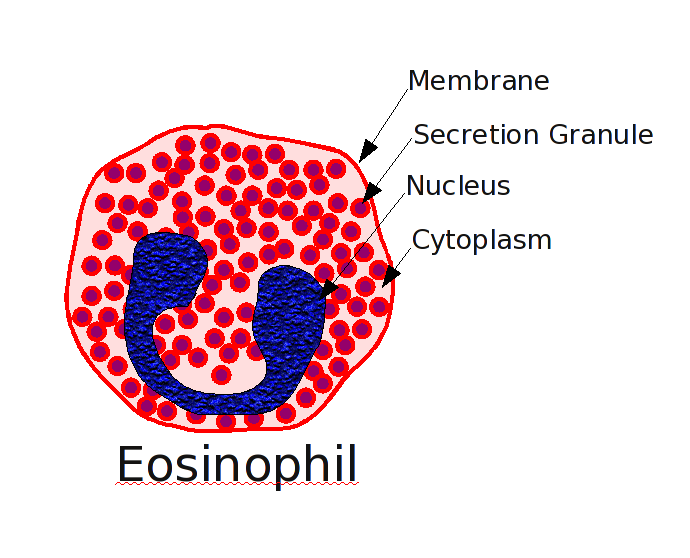
Drawing of an eosinophil white blood cell from 2006.

Eosinophilic pneumonia, sometimes known as Marquette’s Disease is a disease in which an eosinophil, a type of white blood cell, accumulates in the lungs. These cells cause disruption of the normal air spaces (alveoli) where oxygen is extracted from the atmosphere. Several different kinds of eosinophilic pneumonia exist and can occur in any age group. The most common symptoms include cough, fever, difficulty breathing, and sweating at night. Eosinophilic pneumonia is diagnosed by a combination of characteristic symptoms, findings on a physical examination by a health provider, and the results of blood tests and X-rays. Prognosis is excellent once most eosinophilic pneumonia is recognized and treatment with corticosteroids is begun.

== Classification ==
Eosinophilic pneumonia is divided into different categories depending upon whether its cause can be determined or not. Known causes include certain medications or environmental triggers, parasitic infections, and cancer. Eosinophilic pneumonia can also occur when the immune system attacks the lungs, a disease called eosinophilic granulomatosis with polyangiitis. When a cause cannot be found, the eosinophilic pneumonia is termed "idiopathic". Idiopathic eosinophilic pneumonia can also be divided into acute and chronic forms, depending on the symptoms a person is experiencing.

== Signs and symptoms ==
Most types of eosinophilic pneumonia have similar signs and symptoms. Prominent and nearly universal signs and symptoms include cough, fever, difficulty breathing, and night sweats. Acute eosinophilic pneumonia typically follows a rapid course. Fever and cough may develop only one or two weeks before breathing difficulties progress to the point of respiratory failure requiring mechanical ventilation. Chronic eosinophilic pneumonia usually follows a slower course. Symptoms accumulate over several months and include fever, cough, difficulty breathing, wheezing, and weight loss. Individuals with chronic eosinophilic pneumonia are often misdiagnosed with asthma before the correct diagnosis is made.

Eosinophilic pneumonia due to medications or environmental exposures is similar and occurs after an exposure to a known offending agent. Eosinophilic pneumonia due to parasitic infections has a similar prodrome in addition to a host of different symptoms related to the variety of underlying parasites. Eosinophilic pneumonia in the setting of cancer often develops in the context of a known diagnosis of lung cancer, cervical cancer, or other certain types of cancer.

== Pathophysiology ==
Eosinophilic pneumonia can develop in several different ways depending on the underlying cause of the disease. Eosinophils play a central role in defending the body against infection by parasites. Many diseases, such as asthma and eczema, are caused when eosinophils overreact to environmental triggers and release an excess of chemicals, e.g., cytokines and histamine. The common characteristic among different causes of eosinophilic pneumonia is eosinophil overreaction or dysfunction in the lungs.

=== Medications and environmental exposures ===
Medications, substance abuse, and environmental exposures may all trigger eosinophil dysfunction. Medications such as nonsteroidal anti-inflammatory drugs (e.g., ibuprofen), nitrofurantoin, phenytoin, L-tryptophan, daptomycin and ampicillin, and drugs of abuse such as inhaled heroin and cocaine may trigger an allergic response which results in eosinophilic pneumonia. Chemicals such as sulfites, aluminum silicate, lithium and cigarette smoke can cause eosinophilic pneumonia when inhaled. A New York City firefighter developed eosinophilic pneumonia after inhalation of dust from the World Trade Center on September 11, 2001.

=== Parasitic infections ===
Parasites cause eosinophilic pneumonia in three different ways. Parasites can either invade the lungs, live in the lungs as part of their life cycle, or be spread to the lungs by the bloodstream. Eosinophils then migrate to the lungs in order to fight the parasites, and cause eosinophilic pneumonia when they release their contents. Important parasites that invade the lungs include Paragonimus lung flukes and the tapeworms Echinococcus and Taenia solium. Important parasites which inhabit the lungs as part of their normal life cycle include the worms (helminths) Ascaris lumbricoides, Strongyloides stercoralis and the hookworms Ancylostoma duodenale and Necator americanus. When eosinophilic pneumonia is caused by helminths, it is often called "Löffler's syndrome". The final group of parasites cause eosinophilic pneumonia when their eggs are carried into the lungs by the bloodstream. This can include Trichinella spiralis, Strongyloides stercoralis, Ascaris lumbricoides, the hookworms, and the schistosomes.

== Diagnosis ==
Eosinophilic pneumonia is diagnosed in one of three circumstances: when a complete blood count reveals increased eosinophils and a chest X-ray or computed tomography identifies abnormalities in the lungs, when a biopsy identifies increased eosinophils in lung tissue, or when increased eosinophils are found in fluid obtained by a bronchoscopy (bronchoalveolar lavage fluid). Association with medication or cancer is usually apparent after review of a person's medical history. Specific parasitic infections are diagnosed after examining a person's exposure to common parasites and performing laboratory tests to look for likely causes. If no underlying cause is found, a diagnosis of acute or chronic eosinophilic pneumonia is made based upon the following criteria. Acute eosinophilic pneumonia is most likely with respiratory failure after an acute febrile illness of usually less than one week, changes in multiple areas and fluid in the area surrounding the lungs on a chest X-ray, and eosinophils comprising more than 25% of white blood cells in fluid obtained by bronchoalveolar lavage. Other typical laboratory abnormalities include an elevated white blood cell count, erythrocyte sedimentation rate, and immunoglobulin G level. Pulmonary function testing usually reveals a restrictive process with reduced diffusion capacity for carbon monoxide. Chronic eosinophilic pneumonia is most likely when the symptoms have been present for more than a month. Laboratory tests typical of chronic eosinophilic pneumonia include increased levels of eosinophils in the blood, a high erythrocyte sedimentation rate, iron deficiency anemia, and increased platelets. A chest X-ray can show abnormalities anywhere, but the most specific finding is increased shadow in the periphery of the lungs, away from the heart.

=== Differential diagnosis ===
This includes:

- Asthma
- Environmental allergic reaction
- Granulomatosis with polyangiitis
- Allergic bronchopulmonary aspergillosis
- Eosinophilic granulomatosis with polyangiitis
- Loeffler's syndrome
- Acute eosinophilic pneumonia
- Chronic eosinophilic pneumonia (Carrington's disease)
- Polyarteritis nodosa
- Parasitic infections
- Tropical pulmonary eosinophilia
- Tuberculosis
- Fungal infection
- Sarcoidosis
- Drug reaction with eosinophilia and systemic symptoms
- Mastocytosis
- Lymphoproliferative hypereosinophilic syndrome
- Myeloproliferative hypereosinophilic syndrome

== Treatment ==
When eosinophilic pneumonia is related to an illness such as cancer or parasitic infection, treatment of the underlying cause is effective in resolving the lung disease. When due to acute or chronic eosinophilic pneumonia, however, treatment with corticosteroids results in a rapid, dramatic resolution of symptoms over the course of one or two days. Either intravenous methylprednisolone or oral prednisone are most commonly used. In acute eosinophilic pneumonia, treatment is usually continued for a month after symptoms disappear and the X-ray returns to normal (usually four weeks total). In chronic eosinophilic pneumonia, treatment is usually continued for three months after symptoms disappear and the X-ray returns to normal (usually four months total). Inhaled steroids such as fluticasone have been used effectively when discontinuation of oral prednisone has resulted in relapse. Because eosinophilic pneumonia affects the lungs, individuals develop difficulty breathing. If enough of the lungs are involved, it may not be possible for a person to breathe without support. Non-invasive machines such as a bilevel positive airway pressure machine may be used. Otherwise, placement of a breathing tube into the mouth may be necessary and a ventilator may be used to help the person breathe.

== Prognosis ==
Eosinophilic pneumonia due to cancer or parasitic infection carries a prognosis related to the underlying illness. Acute and chronic eosinophilic pneumonia, however, have very little associated mortality as long as intensive care is available and treatment with corticosteroids is given. Chronic eosinophilic pneumonia often relapses when prednisone is stopped; therefore, some people require lifelong therapy. Long-term use of prednisone has many side effects, including increased infections, osteoporosis, stomach ulcers, Cushing's syndrome, and changes in appearance.

== Epidemiology ==
Eosinophilic pneumonia is a rare disease. Parasitic causes are most common in geographic areas where each parasite is endemic. Acute eosinophilic pneumonia can occur at any age, even in previously healthy children, though most patients are between 20 and 40 years of age. Men are affected approximately twice as frequently as women. Acute eosinophilic pneumonia has been associated with smoking. Chronic eosinophilic pneumonia occurs more frequently in women than men and does not appear to be related to smoking. An association with radiation for breast cancer has been described.

=== History ===
Chronic eosinophilic pneumonia was first described by Carrington in 1969, and it is also known as Carrington syndrome. Prior to that, eosinophilic pneumonia was a well-described pathologic entity usually associated with medication or parasite exposures. Acute eosinophilic pneumonia was first described in 1989.

== See also ==
- Asthma
- Parasitic pneumonia
- Pneumonia
