= Cutaneous pili migrans =

- Symptoms: Creeping dot or thread under skin
- Causes: Trauma, no cause
- Diagnostic method: Appearance
- Differential diagnosis: Cutaneous larva migrans
- Treatment: Remove hair
- Frequency: Rare

Cutaneous pili migrans (CMP) is a piece of hair embedded in skin, typically appearing as a dark or reddish creeping dot or thread, in a similar presentation to cutaneous larva migrans. There may be associated pain, though generally no itch.

== Signs and symptoms ==
CMP typically presents as a non-itchy dark or reddish creeping dot or thread, in a similar appearance to cutaneous larva migrans.

== Cause ==
CMP may follow an injury or appear without cause.

== Diagnosis and treatment ==
Diagnosis is by its appearance and may require a magnifying glass. Treatment is by removing the piece of hair.

== Epidemiology and history ==
CMP is rare. The first description was given by Howard S. Yaffee in 1957.
