= Threadworm =

Threadworm may refer to:

- Pinworm (parasite)
- Strongyloides stercoralis
- In non-human contexts, nematodes more broadly, from Ancient Greek νῆμα (nêma, nêmatos, 'thread') and -eiδἠς (-eidēs, 'species').
