= Strongyloidiasis =

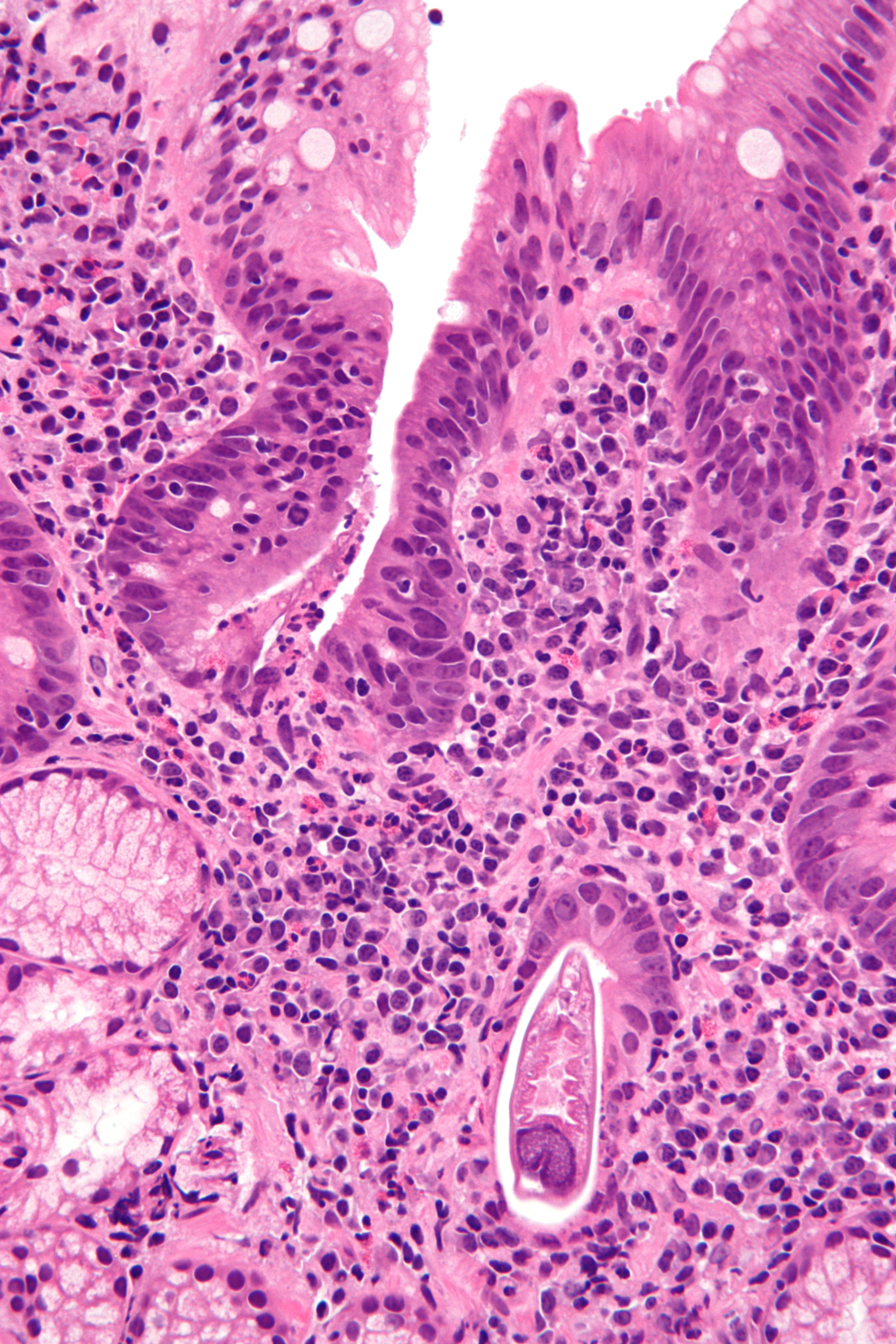
- Micrograph showing strongyloidiasis; a fragment of a worm is seen in the lower right hand corner. H&E stain.
- Specialty: Infectious diseases, helminthologist
- Symptoms: abdominal pain, diarrhea, weight loss, itching and rash
- Complications: Hyperinfection syndrome
- Causes: Strongyloides stercoralis
- Risk factors: Immunocompromisation
- Diagnostic method: Serology, stool tests
- Treatment: Ivermectin

Strongyloidiasis is a human parasitic disease caused by the nematode called Strongyloides stercoralis, or sometimes the closely related S. fülleborni. These helminths belong to a group of nematodes called roundworms. These intestinal worms can cause a number of symptoms in people, principally skin symptoms, abdominal pain, diarrhea and weight loss, but also many other specific and vague symptoms in disseminated disease, and severe life-threatening conditions through hyperinfection. In some people, particularly those who require corticosteroids or other immunosuppressive medication, Strongyloides can cause a hyperinfection syndrome that can lead to death if untreated. The diagnosis is made by blood and stool tests. The medication ivermectin is widely used to treat strongyloidiasis.

Strongyloidiasis is a type of soil-transmitted helminthiasis. Low estimates postulate it to affect 30–100 million people worldwide, mainly in tropical and subtropical countries, while higher estimates conservatively extrapolate that infection is upwards to or above 370 million people. It belongs to the group of neglected tropical diseases, and worldwide efforts are aimed at eradicating the infection.

== Signs and symptoms ==
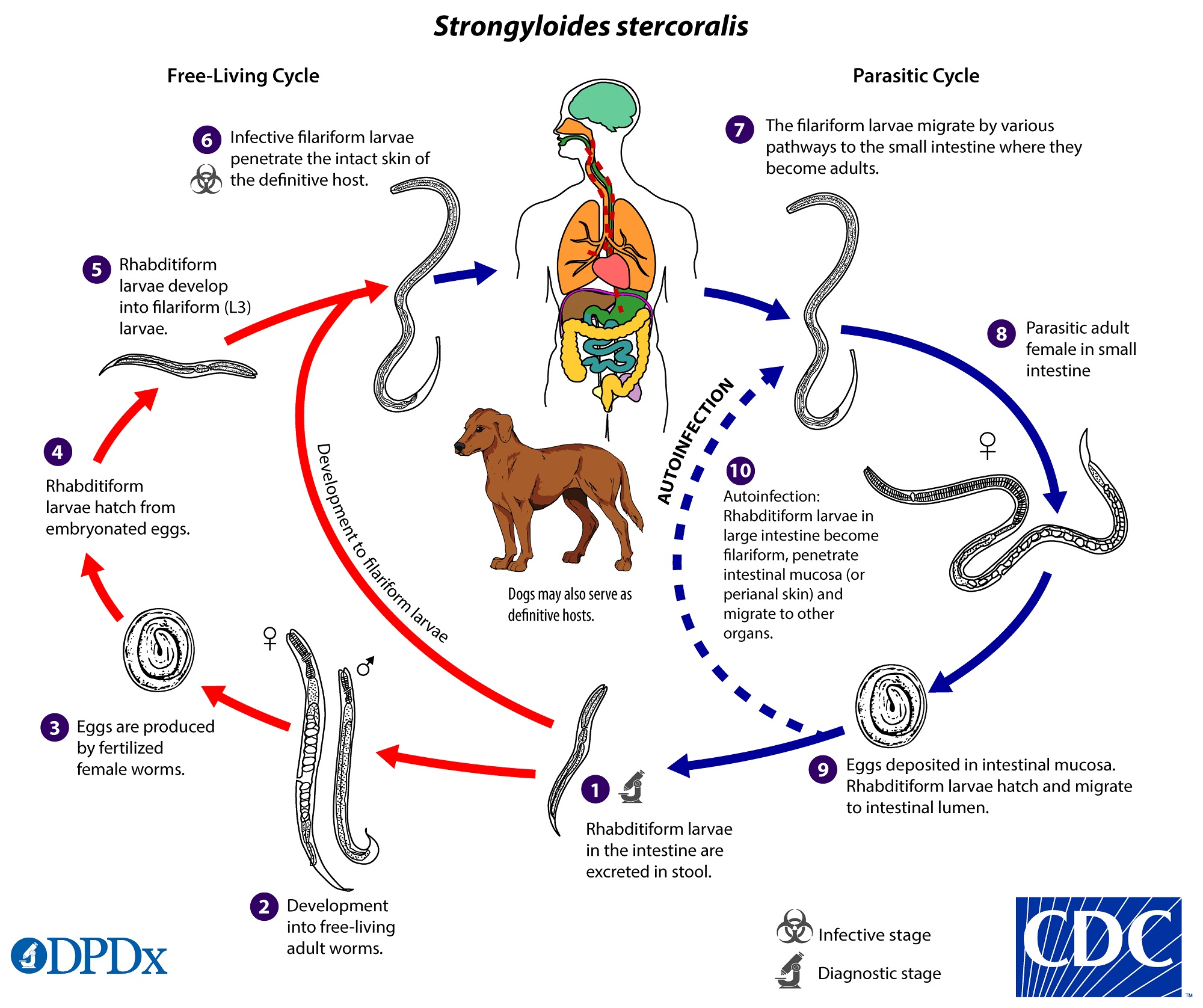
Strongyloides life cycle

Strongyloides infection occurs in five forms. As the infection continues and the larvae mature, there may be respiratory symptoms (Löffler's syndrome). The infection may then become chronic with mainly digestive symptoms. There may be respiratory, skin, and digestive symptoms of reinfection (when larvae migrate through the body) from the skin to the lungs and finally to the small intestine. Finally, the hyperinfection syndrome causes symptoms in many organ systems, including the central nervous system.

=== Uncomplicated disease ===
Frequently asymptomatic. Gastrointestinal system symptoms include abdominal pain and diarrhea and/or conversely constipation. Pulmonary symptoms (including Löffler's syndrome) can occur during pulmonary migration of the filariform larvae. Pulmonary infiltrate may be present through radiological investigation. Dermatologic manifestations include urticarial rashes in the buttocks and waist areas as well as larva currens. Eosinophilia is generally present. Strongyloidiasis can become chronic and then become completely asymptomatic.

=== Disseminated disease ===
Disseminated strongyloidiasis occurs when patients with chronic strongyloidiasis become immunosuppressed. There is a distinction to be made between dissemination and hyperinfection. It is mainly a semantic distinction. There can be mild dissemination where the worm burden is relatively lower yet causes insidious symptoms, or extreme dissemination that the term hyperinfection is used to describe. Thus hyperinfection of varying levels of severe dissemination may present with abdominal pain, distension, shock, pulmonary and neurologic complications, sepsis, haemorrhage, malabsorption, and depending on the combination, degree, number, and severity of symptoms, is potentially fatal. The worms enter the bloodstream from the bowel wall, simultaneously allowing entry of bowel bacteria such as Escherichia coli. This may cause symptoms such as sepsis (bloodstream infection), and the bacteria may spread to other organs where they may cause localized infection such as meningitis. Dissemination without hyperinfection may present to a lesser degree the above and many other symptoms.

Dissemination can occur many decades after the initial infection and has been associated with high dose corticosteroids, organ transplant, any other instances and causes of immunosuppression, HIV, lepromatous leprosy, tertiary syphilis, aplastic anemia, malnutrition, advanced tuberculosis and radiation poisoning. It is often recommended that patients being started on immunosuppression be screened for chronic strongyloidiasis; however, this is often impractical (screen tests are sometimes unavailable) and in developed countries, the prevalence of chronic strongyloidiasis is minimal, so screening is usually not cost-effective, except in endemic areas. The reality of global travel and the need for modern advanced healthcare, even in the so-called "developed world", necessitates that in non-endemic areas there is easily accessible testing and screening for neglected tropical diseases such as strongyloidiasis.

There is not necessarily any eosinophilia in the disseminated disease. The absence of eosinophilia in an infection limited to the gastrointestinal tract may indicate a poor prognosis. Eosinophilia is often absent in disseminated infection. Steroids will also suppress eosinophilia while leading to dissemination and potential hyperinfection.

Escalated disseminated infections caused by immunosuppression can result in a wide variety and variable degree of disparate symptoms depending on the condition and other biological aspects of the individual, that may emulate other diseases or diagnoses. In addition to the many palpable gastrointestinal and varied other symptoms drastic cachexia amidst lassitude is often present, although severe disseminated infections can occur in individuals without weight loss regardless of body mass index.

== Diagnosis ==
Diagnosis rests on the microscopic identification of larvae (rhabditiform and occasionally filariform) in the stool or duodenal fluid. Examination of many samples may be necessary, and not always sufficient, because direct stool examination is relatively insensitive, with a single sample only able to detect larvae in about 25% of cases. It can take 4 weeks from initial infection to the passage of larvae in the stool.

The stool can be examined in wet mounts:

- directly
- after concentration (formalin-ethyl acetate)
- after recovery of the larvae by the Baermann funnel technique
- after culture by the Harada-Mori filter paper technique
- after culture in agar plates

Culture techniques are the most sensitive, but are not routinely available in the West. In the UK, culture is available at either of the Schools of Tropical Medicine in Liverpool or London. The direct examination must be done on a stool sample that is freshly collected and not allowed to cool down, because hookworm eggs hatch on cooling and the larvae are very difficult to distinguish from Strongyloides.

Finding Strongyloides in the stool is negative in up to 70% of tests. It is important to undergo frequent stool sampling and duodenal biopsy if a severe infection is suspected. The duodenal fluid can be examined using techniques such as the Enterotest string or duodenal aspiration. Larvae may be detected in sputum from patients with disseminated strongyloidiasis.

Given the poor ability of stool examination to diagnose Strongyloides, detecting antibodies by ELISA can be useful. Serology can cross-react with other parasites, remain positive for years after successful treatment or be falsely negative in immunocompromised patients. Infected patients will also often have an elevated eosinophil count, with an average of absolute eosinophil count of 1000 in one series. Eosinophilia of a gastrointestinal infection may fluctuate in response to larval output, or may be permanently lacking in some disseminated infections. Hence lack of eosinophilia is not evidence of the absence of infection. The combination of clinical suspicion, a positive antibody, and peripheral eosinophilia can strongly suggest Stronglyoides infection.

It would be useful to have significant advances in the sensitivity of the means of diagnosis, as it would also solve the challenging problem of proof of cure. If a definitive diagnosis is solved then it stands to reason that proof of cure becomes easily realizable.

== Treatment ==
The consensus drug of choice for the treatment of uncomplicated strongyloidiasis is ivermectin. However, even if it is considered the main drug of choice, recent studies have illustrated the challenges in ivermectin curing strongyloidiasis. Ivermectin does not kill the Strongyloides larvae, only the adult worms, therefore repeat dosing may be necessary to properly eradicate the infection. There is an auto-infective cycle of roughly two weeks during which ivermectin should be re-administered; however, additional dosing may still be necessary as it will not kill Strongyloides in the blood or larvae deep within the bowels or diverticula. Other drugs that can be effective are albendazole and thiabendazole (25 mg/kg twice daily for 5 days—400 mg maximum (generally)). All patients who are at risk of disseminated strongyloidiasis should be treated. The optimal duration of treatment for patients with disseminated infections is not clear.

Treatment of strongyloidiasis can be difficult and if ceasing treatment before being entirely cleared Strongyloides via the autoinfective cycle has been known to live in individuals for decades; even after initial or inadequate sustained treatment. Continued treatment, blood, and stool monitoring thus may be necessary even if symptoms temporarily resolve. As cited earlier, since some infections are insidiously asymptomatic, and relatively expensive bloodwork is often inconclusive via false-positives or false-negatives, just as stool samples can be unreliable in diagnoses, there is yet no real gold standard for proof of cure, mirroring the lack of an efficient and reliable methodology of diagnosis. An objective eradication standard for strongyloidiasis is elusive given the high degree of suspicion needed to even begin treatment, the sometimes difficulty of the only definitive diagnostic criteria of detecting and isolating larvae or adult Strongyloides, the importance of early diagnosis, particularly before steroid treatments, and the very wide variability and exclusion/inclusion of differing collections of diffuse symptoms. Disregarding mis-ascribing bonafide delusional parasitosis disorders, strongyloidiasis should be more well known among medical professionals and have serious consideration for broad educational campaigns in effected geographic locales both within the semi-tropical developed world and otherwise, as well as in the tropical developing world where, among many other neglected tropical diseases, it is endemic.

Government programs are needed to help decontaminate endemic areas and to help affected populations from infection. Furthermore, progress is required in establishing financial support to facilitate and cover affordable medications for individuals in affected at-risk regions and communities to help continue treatments.

There are conflicting reports on effective drug treatments. Ivermectin ineffectiveness and rising drug resistance have been documented. Albendazole is noted by the WHO as being the least effective. Thiabendazole can have severe side effects and is unavailable in many countries. Major inroads are required to advance the development of successful medications and drug protocols for strongyloidiasis and other neglected tropical diseases.

Contagiousness via textiles, unlike Enterobius vermicularis, is unfounded. As is, generally speaking, person-to-person contagiousness of asymptomatic and disseminated infection. It has rarely been transmitted through organ transplantation. Married Vietnam War veterans who were infected, yet never developed significant hyperinfection, lived for multiple decades with non-debilitating disseminated infection, without treatment, with wives who failed to ever contract infection. Contraction occurs overwhelmingly from skin exposure to any contaminated soil, contaminated potting soil, contaminated waters, lack of sanitation, or environmental factors as potential vectors. Nearly never to extraordinarily very rarely documented is a transmission from person to person (besides from infected male homosexual sex), other than closeness of contact to the productive coughing of a very ill hyperinfected individual. It has been shown possible to occur in that situation, or potentially other similar scenarios, it is speculated via pulmonary secretions of a direly hyperinfected individual. In which case treatment for others may be indicated, if deemed necessary by proximity, symptoms, precautions, probable exposures to the same vectors, or through screening of serology and stool samples, until infection is eradicated.

Before administering steroids at least somewhat screening for infection in even remotely potentially susceptible individuals to prevent escalating the infection is advised. As not doing so in certain cohorts can have extremely high mortality rates from inadvertently caused hyperinfection via immunosuppression of application of certain steroids. Thus extreme caution with respect to iatrogenic risks is crucial to avoiding deaths or other adverse consequences in treatment, that of course prefigures a correct diagnosis. People with high exposure to Strongyloides stercoralis may mitigate the risk of strongyloidiasis hyperinfection associated with corticosteroid treatment, with the presumptive use of ivermectin. Such hyperinfection has been a particular concern during the COVID-19 pandemic because of the use of corticosteroids to treat COVID-19. The CDC and other international bodies recommend the use of ivermectin for refugees from areas that have a risk of strongyloidiasis.

During the 1940s, the treatment of choice was enteric-coated tablets of 60 mg gentian violet, three times daily, for 16 days. The cure rate was reported to be only about 50 to 70 percent, requiring repeat courses. It is possible the cure rate was even less than that published in the literature, due to the difficulty in positively diagnosing infection.

== Epidemiology ==
Low estimates postulate it to affect 30–100 million people worldwide, mainly in tropical and subtropical countries, while higher estimates conservatively extrapolate that infection is upwards to or above 370 million people. It belongs to the group of neglected tropical diseases, and worldwide efforts are aimed at eradicating the infection.

== History ==
The disease was first recognized in 1876 by the French physician Louis Alexis Normand, working in the naval hospital in Toulon; he identified the adult worms and sent them to Arthur René Jean Baptiste Bavay, affiliated with France's Superior Council on Health, who observed that these were the adult forms of the larvae found in the stool. In 1883 the German parasitologist Rudolf Leuckart made initial observations on the life cycle of the parasite, and Belgian physician Paul Van Durme (building on observations by the German parasitologist Arthur Looss) described the mode of infection through the skin. The German parasitologist Friedrich Fülleborn described autoinfection and the way by which strongyloidiasis involves the intestine. Interest in the condition increased in the 1940s when it was discovered that those who had acquired the infection abroad and then received immunosuppression developed hyperinfestation syndrome.
