= William Tilbury Fox =

English dermatologist

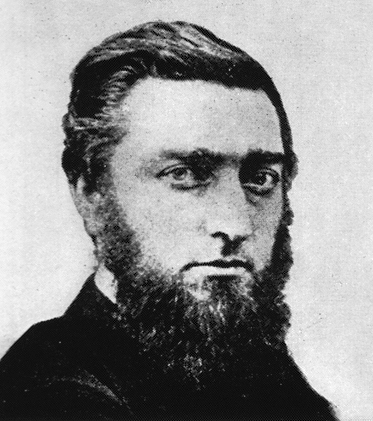
- Born: 1836
- Died: 7 June 1879 (aged 42–43); Paris, France
- Education: University College London
- Scientific career
- Fields: medicine, dermatology
- Workplaces: University College Hospital

William Tilbury Fox (1836 – 7 June 1879) was an English dermatologist.

He was born in Broughton, Hampshire the son of physician Luther Owen Fox and Mary (née Tilbury) Fox, and the brother of Thomas Colcott Fox, also a dermatologist. From 1853 Tilbury Fox attended the University College Hospital medical school. He graduated in 1857 and received his MD in 1858. His first job was at University College Hospital as house physician to Sir William Jenner who was in charge of the dermatology department. He later took jobs at the General Lying-in Hospital in Lambeth and at a general practice. He decided to specialise in obstetrics and took the position of physician-accoucheur at the Farringdon General Dispensary. He was also a senior physician at St John's Hospital for Skin Diseases. In 1863 he published Skin Diseases of Parasitic Origin, in which he was the first physician in the UK to create a thorough study of the pathology and causes of dermatophytosis (ringworm). At this time, he decided to specialise in dermatology rather than obstetrics.

In 1864, Fox developed an interest in tropical dermatology with a trip to India with the Earl of Hopetoun. As a result of this trip he published Scheme for obtaining a better knowledge of endemic skin diseases in India, prepared with T. Farquhar, for the India Office in 1872. In 1866, he took the position of physician to the skin department at Charing Cross Hospital and in 1868 he became the physician in charge of the dermatology department back at University College Hospital.

In the 1870s, Henry Radcliffe Crocker came to the University College Hospital and worked under Fox in the dermatology department. At this time, the practice of specialising in medicine was frowned upon in the United Kingdom (although more popular in continental Europe), but Fox and Crocker were credited with bringing some structure to the field of dermatology. Fox wrote extensively on the subject and in 1875, he published a revised version of Atlas of Skin Diseases by Robert Willan. He also had an editorial position at The Lancet.

William Tilbury Fox died of an aortic condition on 7 June 1879 in Paris, France, at the age of 43. He was survived by his wife Sophia Campbell Fox and was buried at Willesden cemetery in London.

== Bibliography ==
- Skin Diseases of Parasitic Origin. 1863.
- Skin Diseases: their Description, Pathology, Diagnosis and Treatment with a Copious Formulary. 1864.
- Tilbury Fox, William (1864). On impetigo contagiosa, or porrigo. England: Printed by T. Richards.
- Cholera Prospects: Compiled from Personal Observation in the East: for the Information and Guidance of Individuals and Governments (1865)
- Scheme for obtaining a better knowledge of endemic skin diseases in India, prepared with T. Farquhar, for the India Office. 1872.
- Atlas of Skin Diseases. 1875–1877.
- The Epitome of Skin Diseases. 1877.
