= Ground itch =

- Specialty: Dermatology

Ground itch refers to the inflammatory reaction resulting from certain helminthic invasions into the skin.

== Signs and symptoms ==
Effects due to Penetration by larvae

- Maculopapular rash
- Localized erythema
- Intense itching (usually between the toes)

== Cause ==
The responsible agents include:

- Threadworms
  - Strongyloides stercoralis
- Hookworms
  - Ancylostoma duodenale
  - Necator americanus
  - Ancylostoma braziliense

== See also ==
- Cutaneous larva migrans
- Hookworm disease
