= Larva currens =

- Other names: Nutria itch
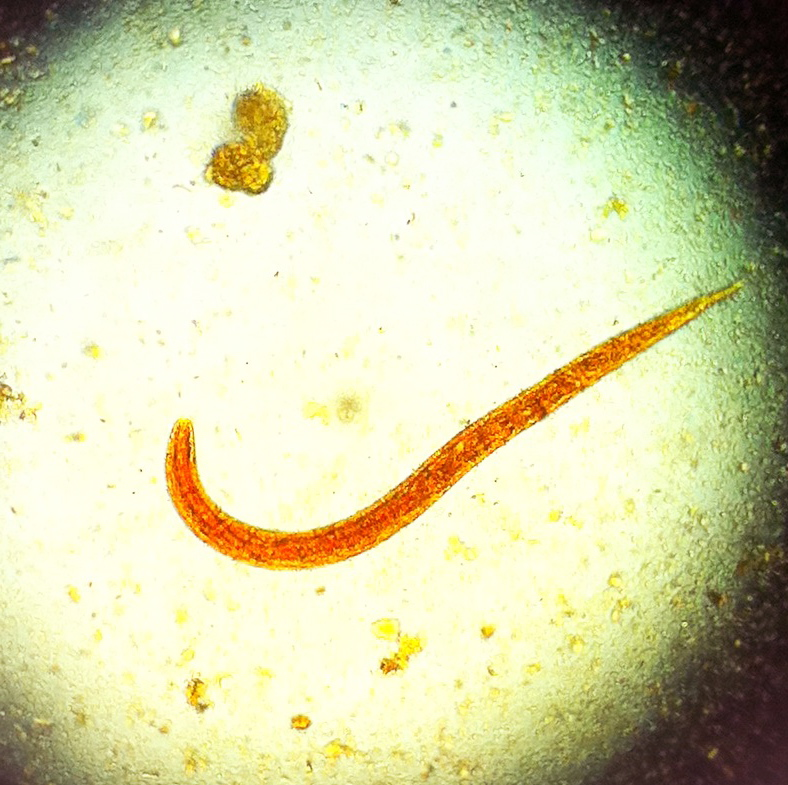
- Iodine stained Strongyloides stercoralis
- Specialty: Dermatology

Larva currens (Latin for racing larva), is an itchy skin condition caused by infections with Strongyloides stercoralis.

It is caused by the intradermal migration of strongyloides and distinguished from cutaneous larva migrans (caused by hookworm) by its rapid migration, perianal involvement and wide band of urticaria.

== See also ==
- List of cutaneous conditions
- List of migrating cutaneous conditions
- Ground itch
