= Henry Radcliffe Crocker =

English dermatologist

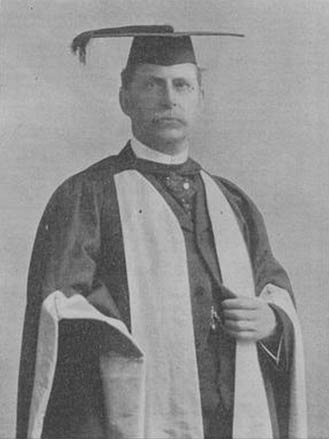
- Born: 6 March 1846; Hove, Sussex, England
- Died: 22 August 1909 (aged 63); Engelberg, Obwalden, Switzerland
- Education: University College London
- Scientific career
- Fields: Medicine, Dermatology
- Workplaces: University College Hospital

Henry Radcliffe Crocker, FRCP (6 March 1846 – 22 August 1909) was an English dermatologist. Originally from Hove in Sussex, England, Crocker started his working life as an apprentice to a general practitioner before going to London to attend the University College Hospital medical school. Working as a resident medical officer with William Tilbury Fox, Crocker began a lifelong career in dermatology. With his 1888 book Diseases of the Skin: their Description, Pathology, Diagnosis and Treatment, he became known as a leading figure of dermatology.

== Early life ==
Crocker was born in 1846 in Hove, Sussex to Henry and Maria (née Walters) Crocker. His father was a chemist, a career that Crocker at first sought to take up. At 16, he left his private school in Brighton to take up an apprenticeship with a general practitioner in Silverdale, Staffordshire. In 1870 he became a student at University College Hospital medical school in London. He worked part-time as a drug dispenser in Sloane Street. As an undergraduate student, Crocker won gold medals in materia medica, clinical medicine and forensic medicine, as well as a university scholarship. Crocker was generally known by his middle name, Radcliffe, and throughout his career this was sometimes mistaken as the first part of his surname.

== Medical career ==
After receiving his Membership of the Royal College of Surgeons (MRCS) qualification, Bachelor of Science degree and then in 1875 his MD, Crocker obtained a position as resident obstetric physician and physician's assistant at University College Hospital. He then held posts at the Brompton Hospital for Consumption and Diseases of the Chest and Charing Cross Hospital before returning to University College Hospital as resident medical officer. He worked under dermatologist William Tilbury Fox, and began to develop his own dermatological career as assistant medical officer in the hospital's dermatology department. At this time, the practice of specialising in medicine was somewhat frowned upon in the United Kingdom (although more popular in continental Europe), but Tilbury Fox and Crocker were credited with bringing some structure to the field of dermatology.

From 1877, Crocker was a member (and later a fellow) of the Royal College of Physicians. Following the death of Tilbury Fox in 1879, Crocker succeeded him as physician in the department of dermatology at University College Hospital. In this position, Crocker was able to devote himself to the study of the skin and its diseases. Although a specialist, in his clinical work, he emphasised the value of treating the whole patient. His research concentrated on the epidemiology of skin diseases and histology, noting the importance of microscopic inspection of skin cells. During his career, he was the first to describe or name diseases such as granuloma annulare and erythema elevatum diutinum.

In 1888, Crocker published Diseases of the Skin: their Description, Pathology, Diagnosis and Treatment, a textbook that helped to establish him as a leading figure in dermatology.

=== Diagnosis of the "Elephant Man" ===
At a meeting of the Pathological Society of London in 1885, Crocker was the first to put forward a theory on the condition of Joseph Merrick, known as the Elephant Man. Merrick was not present at the meeting, but surgeon Frederick Treves, who had examined him, showed photographs. Crocker had also had the opportunity to view Merrick the previous year when he was exhibited at a freak shop on Whitechapel Road. Crocker suggested that Merrick's condition was caused by a combination of dermatolysis and bone deformities, as a result of changes in his nervous system. Crocker included a description of the case of Joseph Merrick in his book, Diseases of the Skin: their Description, Pathology, Diagnosis and Treatment.

== Personal life ==
Crocker married Constance Mary Fussell on 3 April 1880. She was the daughter of Edward Francis Fussell, a medical officer and doctor at Sussex County Hospital. They had no children.

He died on 22 August 1909, aged 63, while on holiday in Engelberg, a village in Switzerland. The cause of death was heart failure.

== Bibliography ==
- Crocker, Henry Radcliffe (1888), Diseases of the Skin: their Description, Pathology, Diagnosis and Treatment, London: H. K. Lewis, OCLC 11820909
