= Erythema gyratum repens =

Red wavy rash associated with internal cancer

- Specialty: Dermatology
- Symptoms: Expanding swirly wavy red lines, scale, itch
- Usual onset: Older adults (60s)
- Causes: Cancer: lung cancer, oesophageal cancer, breast cancer
- Diagnostic method: Blood tests; complete blood count, PSA, antinuclear antibodies; Medical imaging: chest X-ray, mammogram, CT scan; Endoscopy
- Differential diagnosis: Necrolytic migratory erythema, erythema migrans, erythrokeratodermia variabilis, subacute cutaneous lupus erythematosus, tinea corporis
- Treatment: Treat underlying cause
- Medication: Antihistamines
- Prognosis: Resolves with successful cancer treatment
- Frequency: Rare, male:females (2:1)

Erythema gyratum repens is a skin condition that has a strong association with internal cancers. It characteristically presents with red wavy lines, generally in older adults. These regular whirly rings rapidly and repetitively appear within existing ones, giving the impression that the rash is moving. The resulting pattern is similar to wood grain. There is often an intense itch and scale over the leading edge, which may be slightly raised.

The cause is believed to have an immunological base. 80% of cases have an underlying cancer, of which almost half have lung cancer. Sometimes no cause is found.

Diagnosis is generally by its appearance, although tests may be required to exclude other conditions. These tests may include blood tests. A cancer may be located using medical imaging. Necrolytic migratory erythema and erythema migrans are some of many other skin conditions that may appear similar.

Treatment and outlook depend on the underlying cause. Antihistamines may help to reduce the itch. The rash typically resolves with successful cancer treatment.

The condition is rare. Males are affected twice as frequently as females. J. A. Gammel first described the condition in 1952.

== Signs and symptoms ==
Erythema gyratum repens characteristically presents as wavy red lines on the skin. These regular whirly rings rapidly and repetitively appear within existing ones, expanding outward at a rate of up to 1 cm a day, giving the impression that the rash is moving. The resulting pattern is similar to wood grain. There is typically an intense itch and scale over the leading edge, which may be slightly raised. The trunk and limbs are most frequently affected. Thickening of the skin of the palms co-exists in around 10% of affected individuals, whatever the underlying cause. The skin may become extremely dry. Onset is generally in older adults; after the age of 60-years.

== Cause ==
The cause of erythema gyratum repens is believed to have an immunological base. 80% of cases have an underlying cancer, of which almost half have lung cancer. Other cancers reported to be associated include cancers of the oesophagus and breast, and less frequently gastric cancer, uterine cancer, throat cancer, pancreas cancer and lymphoma. The rash generally precedes the cancer diagnosis by around 9 months. Less frequently, the cause may be tuberculosis of the lung, or no cause is found. Other rare reported associations have included cryptogenic organizing pneumonia and rheumatoid arthritis.

== Diagnosis ==
Diagnosis is generally by its appearance. Tests include blood tests such as a complete blood count which may reveal raised eosinophils. Other blood tests include PSA, antinuclear antibodies and biochemistry. Medical imaging may locate a cancer; chest X-ray, mammogram, CT scan of pelvis and abdomen. If indicated then an endoscopy may be required; colonoscopy, gastroscopy.

=== Differential diagnosis ===
Necrolytic migratory erythema, erythema migrans, tinea corporis, erythrokeratodermia variabilis, and subacute cutaneous lupus erythematosus are some of many other skin conditions that may appear similar.

== Treatment ==
Treatment and outlook depend on the underlying cause. Antihistamines may help to reduce the itch, although the role of applying a steroid cream is unclear. The rash typically resolves with successful cancer treatment.

== Epidemiology ==
The condition is rare. Males are affected twice as frequently as females.

== History ==
J. A. Gammel first described the condition in 1952, in an individual who was later found to have breast cancer.

== See also ==
- List of cutaneous conditions associated with internal malignancy
- List of migrating cutaneous conditions
