= Fulham Hospital =

- Location within Hammersmith and Fulham

Geography
- Location: Fulham Palace Road, Hammersmith, London, England
- Coordinates: 51.4871°N 0.2195°W

Organisation
- Care system: NHS England

Services
- Emergency department: Yes
- Beds: 394

History
- Founded: 1884 (as the Fulham Parish Infirmary)
- Closed: 1973

Links
- Lists: Hospitals in England

Fulham Hospital was an English hospital in the west London district of Fulham from 1884 to 1973. From 1957 onwards it was merged with the Charing Cross Hospital and was gradually demolished. Charing Cross Hospital relocated from central London and now occupies the former Fulham Hospital site, south of St Dunstan's Road.

== History ==
The hospital started as the Fulham Parish Infirmary, built for inmates of Fulham Workhouse, completed in 1848. Opened in 1884, the infirmary had two doctors and 31 nurses attending to 486 patients, many of whom were chronically ill with or without dementia. In 1905, an operating theatre was installed and a nurses' home was built.

During the early part of World War I, the Infirmary cared for wounded soldiers from the First Battle of Ypres, and in 1915 was taken over by the War Office to become Fulham Military Hospital. This was expanded during the war, and by 1917 had 1130 beds. Nearby Syon House and Fulham Palace were also used as temporary extensions of the hospital's facilities. In 1919, the hospital, no longer required by the War Office, briefly reverted to its old name of Fulham Infirmary, but, having also been called St Christopher's Hospital, was renamed Fulham Hospital in 1928 (as distinct from the other Fulham Hospital in Seagrave Road, which had become the "Western Fever Hospital" in 1885). The former workhouse became the Fulham Institution, a hospital offering 475 places for the chronic sick and aged, while the Fulham Hospital had 564 places.

In 1930, administration of the hospital was taken over by London County Council. At the time of transfer the medical superintendent was CT Parsons, MD (London). The steward HW Davies and the Matron CM Allbutt. Allbutt was a fellow of the British College of Nursing.

In 1934, the hospital and Institution were merged, becoming Fulham Hospital 1 and Fulham Hospital 2 respectively. In the late 1930s the two Fulham Hospitals had 711 beds.

In World War II, the hospital received wounded soldiers from Dunkirk, and was subject to bomb damage several times. Fulham Hospital 2 eventually closed, and in 1948 Fulham Hospital joined the NHS under the management of the South West Metropolitan Regional Health Board, providing 394 beds.

During the 1950s, the workhouse building was demolished, and in 1957 it was announced that the hospital would merge with the Charing Cross Hospital – then located around five miles to the east in central London. From the late 1950s onwards, construction of a new hospital progressed, starting initially on the site of the former workhouse and Board of Guardians offices. The Fulham Hospital was demolished in phases and finally closed in 1973, with the new Charing Cross Hospital (Fulham) opened by Queen Elizabeth II in the same year. An old weathervane from Fulham Infirmary is preserved as a feature in the main garden behind the current hospital.

Badge for nurses who trained at the hospital
