= List of migrating cutaneous conditions =

A number of cutaneous conditions can occur on the skin and appear to move or migrate through the skin.

Migrating conditions of or affecting the human integumentary system
Condition	Maximum rate of migration
Cutaneous larva migrans	2 cm/day
Larva migrans profundus (Gnathostomiasis)	24 cm/day
Larva currens	10 cm/hour
Erythema gyratum repens	1 cm/day

== See also ==
- List of conditions associated with café au lait macules
- List of contact allergens
- List of cutaneous conditions associated with increased risk of nonmelanoma skin cancer
- List of cutaneous conditions associated with internal malignancy
- List of cutaneous conditions caused by mutations in keratins
- List of cutaneous neoplasms associated with systemic syndromes
- List of cutaneous conditions caused by problems with junctional proteins
- List of dental abnormalities associated with cutaneous conditions
- List of genes mutated in cutaneous conditions
- List of genes mutated in pigmented cutaneous lesions
- List of histologic stains that aid in diagnosis of cutaneous conditions
- List of human leukocyte antigen alleles associated with cutaneous conditions
- List of immunofluorescence findings for autoimmune bullous conditions
- List of inclusion bodies that aid in diagnosis of cutaneous conditions
- List of keratins expressed in the human integumentary system
- List of radiographic findings associated with cutaneous conditions
- List of specialized glands within the human integumentary system
- List of spiders associated with cutaneous reactions
- List of target antigens in pemphigoid
- List of target antigens in pemphigus
- List of verrucous carcinoma subtypes
- List of xanthoma variants associated with hyperlipoproteinemia subtypes
