= Figurate erythema =

Skin reddening in a wavy or ringed pattern

- Concentric circles in Lyme disease (example of a figurate erythema)
- Specialty: Dermatology
- Symptoms: Multiple red, wavy rings, concentric circles, arcs
- Types: Classic types:erythema annulare centrifugum, erythema gyratum repens, erythema migrans, erythema marginatum

Figurate erythema describes a rash linked to various skin conditions, characterized by one or more red, wavy rings, concentric circles, or arcs, typically recognised as annular patterns.

== Classification ==
Four classic types have been reported as erythema annulare centrifugum, erythema gyratum repens, erythema migrans and erythema marginatum, though the pattern is seen in numerous other conditions. Causes may also be divided into infectious, malignant, and drug reactions.

== Signs and symptoms ==
Figurate erythema is typically characterized by multiple red, wavy rings, concentric circles, and arcs, typically recognised as annular patterns. The initial lesion is typically a slightly raised reddish bump which extends outwards and may have a trailing scale and central clearing. The lesions may be fixed, transient, or migratory.

== Diagnosis ==
Distinguishing between the varying types may be easier by describing its location, how rapidly it expands, and the characteristics of its border. Diagnosis is often by exclusion. To confirm a diagnosis, a biopsy may be required.

== History ==
The term was first described by Thomas Fox in 1889.
