= Ethylene chloride =

Ethylene chloride is a chemical name that can refer to either of the following compounds:

1,2-dichloroethane: formula C_{2}H_{4}Cl_{2}	1,2-Dichloroethane
vinyl chloride: formula C_{2}H_{3}Cl	Vinyl chloride: structural formula
