= August Löffler =

German painter

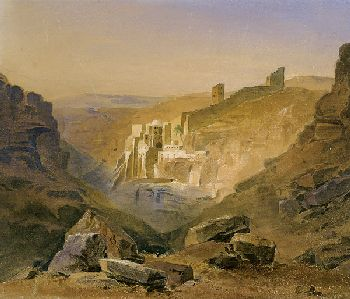
Das Kloster Santa Saba in der judäischen Wüste, c. 1849

August Löffler (May 24, 1822 – January 19, 1866) was a German painter.

Löffler was born in Munich, and studied under Heinrich Adam and Carl Rottmann, and first painted scenes of Isarthal, near Munich. In 1846 he traveled to Istria and upper Italy, and in 1849 to the Middle East. Here he painted a noteworthy panorama of Jerusalem, and traveled through Egypt, Palestine, and Asia Minor, returning to Munich at the end of 1850. In 1851 he went to Dresden and then Berlin, and in the following years painted a number of landscapes of Palestine and Greece for the kings of Prussia and Württemberg.

In 1853 he accompanied Ludwig Thiersch to Greece and made a number of studies, executing a large painting, Delphi, upon his return. In 1856 he traveled to Venice and Milan to study the Old Masters. In 1857 he painted Jerusalem, Bethlehem, Jafa, Saba, Damascus, and the Red Sea for the king of Württemberg, and drew the cartoons Die Findung Moses' and Gott erscheint dem Elias auf dem Berg Horeb. In 1863 he painted views of Athens from Kolonos and Jerusalem from the Mount of Olives, as well as four large murals — of Memphis, Jerusalem, Athens, and Rome — for the society halls in Kochel. He died in 1866 in Munich.

== Note ==
- This article, or an earlier version, was translated from the 4th edition of the Meyers Konversations-Lexikon (1890), a publication now in the public domain.
