= Wilhelm Löffler (medical doctor) =

Swiss physician (1887–1972)

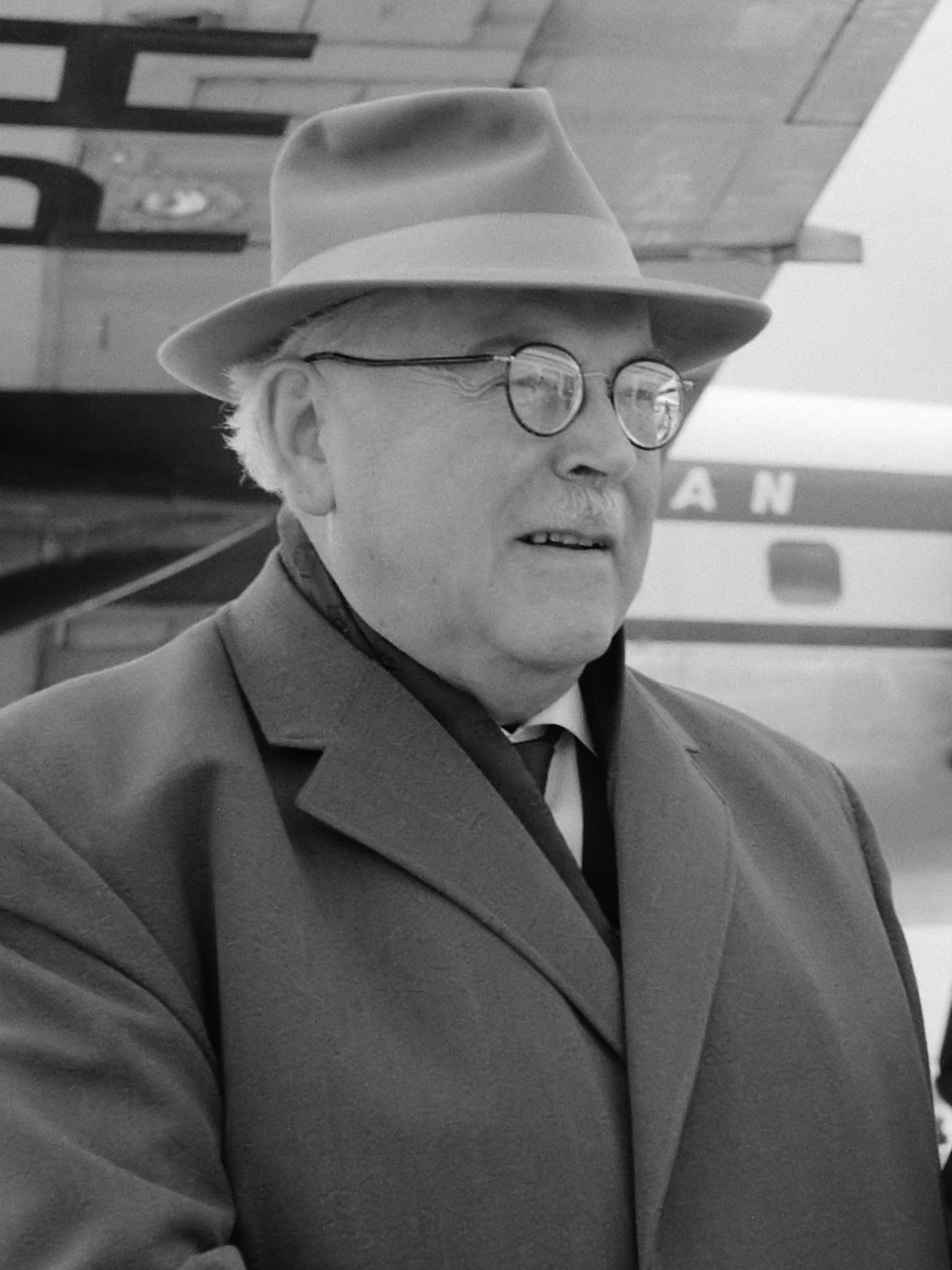
Wilhelm Löffler (1961)

Wilhelm Löffler (28 June 1887 – 25 November 1972) was a Swiss medical doctor who was best known for his research on Loeffler endocarditis and Löffler's syndrome.

== History ==
After studying in various cities including Geneva, Vienna, Strassburg, and Basel, he obtained his doctorate in 1911. After working under various mentors he succeeded Otto Nägeli (1871-1938) as an associate professor of internal medicine and director of the medical polyclinic at the institution from 1921-1937. From 1937-1957, he functioned as head of the medical clinic and full professor of internal medicine. He retired in 1938, after serving as the Dean of Medical Faculty for two years and continued to give regular lectures until 1971. He was well known for being a caring professor, often challenging his students to ensure they understood the information, and promoting the scientific method in clinical medicine.

== Contributions to Medicine ==
Loeffler endocarditis and Löffler's syndrome are named for him.

He promoted the X-ray surveillance screening for tuberculosis in the civilian population and within military ranks and effectively helped reduce the number of tuberculosis cases

In 1955, he confirmed the diagnosis (made by Dr. Mülders from Leiden) of German novelist and Nobel laureate Thomas Mann with thrombophlebitis.
