= Karl Löffler =

German Nazi, later exernorated (dates unknown)

Karl Löffler was a German Nazi who served as head of the "Jewish Desk" (or Jewish Affairs) department of the Gestapo in Cologne, Germany during the 1930s and 1940s. As such, he was in charge of coordinating the deportations of the Jewish community of Cologne to concentration camps.

After the war, Löffler was fully exonerated by the Denazification courts of Cologne after receiving positive recommendations from the heads of the Protestant, Catholic, and Jewish churches in Cologne. He appealed successively to have his pension restored, to have his pension increased to account for his promotions, and to have his promotions during his Gestapo service recognized.

Historian Eric A. Johnson used Löffler as an example of what he called "local Eichmanns" in his book, Nazi Terror: The Gestapo, Jews, and Ordinary Germans. Johnson points out that local Gestapo chiefs were usually prosecuted, but Gestapo officials below that level were often not.
