= Parasitic pneumonia =

Infection of the lungs with parasites

Parasitic pneumonia is a type of pneumonia caused by parasites. Pneumonia is an inflammatory condition of the lungs, most commonly caused by bacteria or viruses. Parasites are an uncommon cause of pneumonia, usually affecting immunocompromised individuals or those in underdeveloped countries. In developed countries, it is most common to see parasitic pneumonia in immigrants or recently returning travelers. In recent years, improved hygiene and global socioeconomic conditions have decreased the prevalence of parasitic pneumonias, but susceptibility is increasing due to increased travel, urbanization, and population of immunocompromised individuals.

This article specifically refers to parasitic pneumonia, and will not discuss other pulmonary conditions caused by parasites. For example, pulmonary malaria may present as acute respiratory distress syndrome but likely not pneumonia.

== Signs and symptoms ==
Parasitic pneumonia can present very differently depending on the individual and involved parasite. The most common symptoms caused by pneumonia include fever, fatigue, cough, shortness of breath, chest pain, and mental status changes. These symptoms are nonspecific for individual causes of parasitic pneumonia, and may be subtle in immunocompromised patients.

== Causes ==
Causes of parasitic pneumonia include:

- Ancylostoma duodenale
- Ascaris lumbricoides
- Entamoeba histolytica
- Necator americanus
- Strongyloides stercoralis
- Toxoplasma gondii

== Pathophysiology ==
Parasites often have complex life cycles and can infect humans in a number of ways including through insect vectors, contact with soil, or direct ingestion. Parasites can affect the lungs in a number of mechanisms, including as a direct infection, while migrating to other organs, or through an inflammatory response to a toxin (see loeffler's syndrome).

== Diagnosis ==
Diagnosis of pneumonia is often made based on physical exam and radiographic findings. Parasitic pneumonia should be suspected in patients who are immunocompromised and/or recently travelled/immigrated.

=== Physical Exam ===
Common physical exam findings of pneumonia include low blood pressure, elevated heart rate, elevated respiratory rate, and low oxygen saturation. Auscultation of the lungs may reveal decreased breath sounds, dullness to percussion, increased resonance, and crackles at the site of pneumonia.

=== Laboratory findings ===
Common laboratory findings for parasitic pneumonia includes peripheral eosinophilia, or elevated eosinophil levels on a complete blood count. Although this may be present in any parasitic infection, this is a defining feature of Loeffler's syndrome.

Parasites may be detected by specific tests depending on which organ system they affect. Those directly affecting the lung may be detected using sputum cultures. Parasites that pass through the gastrointestinal tract in addition to the lungs may be detected using stool specimen. Additional serologic tests may be used to confirm diagnosis of a specific parasite, however these may be positive for multiple years following successful treatment depending on the species.

=== Radiography findings ===
Pneumonia is commonly diagnosed using a chest X-ray. Some common findings include lobar consolidations, interstitial infiltrates, and/or pleural effusions. While these are frequently encountered findings, they are not specific for any one pathogen. Some parasites, however, have specific findings on chest imaging that may reveal the causative organism.

Parasites that directly infect the lungs and form cysts such as echinococcus and paragonimus westermani can present with small lesions on chest X-ray or computerized tomography that may be confused with tuberculosis or malignant disease.

Entamoeba histolytica, which causes amoebiasis, may initially appear on imaging as consolidation of the right lower lung, but may also progress to abscess formation, which can be seen on imaging.

== Prevention ==
There are currently no approved vaccines to prevent parasitic pneumonia. Prevention of many types of parasitic infection involves hand washing, washing of kitchen utensils that come in contact with meat, and thorough cooking of meats. In addition, prevention of specific types of parasitic pneumonia depend on the individual and parasite. For example, prevention of toxoplasmosis involves avoiding contact with cat feces and treatment with antibiotics in patients with AIDS.

== Management ==
Management of parasitic pneumonia is highly variable and is based on the specific parasite, severity of disease, and immunocompromised status of the patient. In general, patients that develop parasitic pneumonia require anti-parasitic medications with a few exceptions. There are multiple anti-parasitic medications available which may either directly kill the parasite or prevent its growth. Typically, these medications will resolve the disease, however in rare cases surgical resection may be required.
