= Western Hospital, Fulham =

Western Hospital
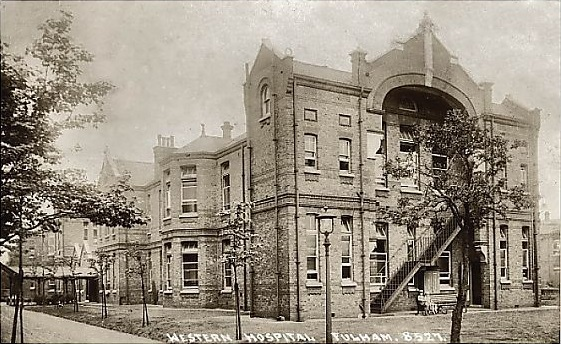
- Western Hospital, Fulham

- Location within Hammersmith and Fulham

Geography
- Location: Fulham, London, England, United Kingdom
- Coordinates: 51.4851°N 0.1953°W

Organisation
- Type: Infectious diseases

Services
- Beds: up to 517

History
- Founded: 1877; 149 years ago
- Closed: 1979; 47 years ago

Links
- Lists: Hospitals in England

The Western Fever Hospital, Fulham, originally the Western Hospital, was set up as a public hospital for isolating smallpox by the Metropolitan Asylums Board in Fulham, London, in 1877. In 1933 the LCC took over its management. In 1949 the site became part of the National Health Service. During its century-long existence the hospital always specialised in various forms of infectious diseases, ending up as the country's specialist centre for the treatment of Poliomyelitis. With the dramatic decline in cases globally, the NHS shut down the facility in 1979 and sold off the 13-acre site to commercial developers.

== History ==
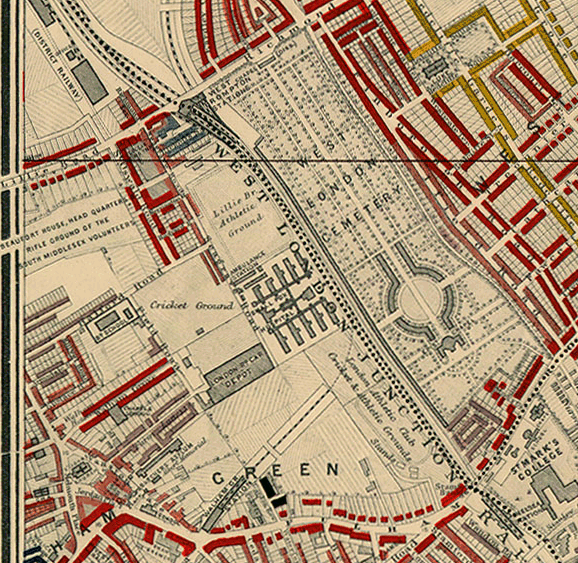
Location of the hospital, adjacent to the railway line. The hospital is in the middle of the map. (Click to enlarge). Detail from Charles Booth's 1889 descriptive map of London.

The hospital was established as the Western Hospital in Fulham, London, in 1877. It became the Western Fever Hospital in 1885 (soon after the 1884 establishment of nearby Fulham Parish Infirmary, later renamed Fulham Hospital), and additional fever blocks were built in the early 1890s.

It joined the National Health Service under the management of the South West Metropolitan Regional Health Board in 1948. It closed in 1979 and the hospital was subsequently demolished.
