= Loeffler endocarditis =

- Other names: Eosinophilic endocarditis
- Specialty: Cardiology

Loeffler endocarditis is a form of heart disease characterized by a stiffened, poorly-functioning heart caused by infiltration of the heart by white blood cells known as eosinophils. Restrictive cardiomyopathy is a disease of the heart muscle which results in impaired diastolic filling of the heart ventricles, i.e. the large heart chambers which pump blood into the pulmonary or systemic circulation. Diastole is the part of the cardiac contraction-relaxation cycle in which the heart fills with venous blood after the emptying done during its previous systole (i.e. contraction).

An eosinophil-based specific type of heart damage was first described by the Swiss doctor, Wilhelm Loeffler, in 1936. As initially described, the disorder manifests as a restrictive cardiomyopathy, i.e. a poorly expanding and contracting rigid heart that was infiltrated with eosinophils and showed replacement of heart cells by stiff fibrotic connective tissue.

Loeffler endocarditis is now regarded as a manifestation of eosinophilic myocarditis, a disorder that involves the infiltration of the heart's muscular layer by eosinophils that leads to three progressive clinical stages. The first stage involves acute inflammation and subsequent death of heart muscle cells. This stage is dominated by signs and symptoms of the acute coronary syndrome such as angina, heart attack, and congestive heart failure. In the second stage, the endocardium (i.e. interior wall) of the heart forms blood clots which break off and then travel through and block various arteries; this clotting stage may dominate the initial presentation in some individuals. The third stage is a fibrotic stage, i.e. Loeffler endocarditis, wherein scarring replaces damaged heart muscle tissue to cause a poorly contracting heart and/or heart valve disease. Recent publications commonly refer to Loeffler endocarditis as a historical term for the third stage of eosinophilic myocarditis.

== Signs and symptoms ==
The signs and symptoms of Loeffler endocarditis tend to reflect the many underlying disorders causing eosinophil dysfunction as well as the widely differing progression rates of cardiac damage. Before cardiac symptoms are detected, individuals may suffer symptoms of a common cold, asthma, rhinitis, urticarial, or other allergic disorder. Cardiac manifestations include life-threatening conditions such as cardiogenic shock or sudden death due to abnormal heart rhythms. More commonly, however, the presenting cardiac signs and symptoms of the disorder are the same as those seen in other forms of cardiomyopathy: the heart arrhythmia of ventricular fibrillation seen as an irregular pulse and heart rate, other cardiac arrhythmias, symptoms of these arrhythmias such as chest palpitations, dizziness, light headedness, and fainting; and symptoms of a heart failure such as fatigue, edema, i.e. swelling, of the lower extremities, and shortness of breath.

Hypereosinophilia (i.e. blood eosinophil counts at or above 1,500 per microliter) or, less commonly, eosinophilia (counts above 500 but below 1,500 per microliter) are found in the vast majority of cases and are valuable clues pointing to this rather than other types of cardiomyopathies. However, elevated blood eosinophil counts may not occur during the early phase of the disorder. Other, less specific laboratory findings implicate a cardiac disorder but not necessarily eosinophilic myocarditis. These include elevations in blood markers for systemic inflammation (e.g. C reactive protein, erythrocyte sedimentation rate) and cardiac injury (e.g. creatine kinase, troponins); and abnormal electrocardiograms ( mostly ST segment-T wave abnormalities).

== Pathogenesis ==
Eosinophilic states that may occur in and underlie Loeffler endocarditis (as well as the other stages of eosinophilic myocarditis) include primary and secondary eosinophilias or hypereosinophilias. Primary eosinophilias or hypereosinophilias (i.e. disorders in which the eosinophil appears to be intrinsically diseased) that lead to Loeffler endocarditis are clonal hypereosinophilia, chronic eosinophilic leukemia and the hypereosinophilic syndrome. Secondary causes (i.e. disorders in which other diseases cause the eosinophil to become dysfunctional) include allergic and autoimmune diseases; infections due to certain parasitic worms, protozoa, and viruses; malignant and premalignant hematologic disorders commonly associated with eosinophilia or hypereosinophilia; and adverse reactions to various drugs.

The disorder develops because of eosinophilic penetration into the cardiac tissues. This leads to a fibrotic thickening of portions of the heart (similar to that of endomyocardial fibrosis) and heart valves. In consequence, the heart becomes rigid and poorly contractile while the heart valves may become stenotic or insufficient, i.e. reduced in ability to open or close, respectively. The damaged heart may also develop mural thrombi, i.e. clots which lay against ventricle walls, tend to break off, and flow through and block arteries; this condition often precedes the fibrotic stage of eosinophilic myocarditis and is termed the thrombotic stage.

== Diagnosis ==
The diagnosis of Loeffler endocarditis should be considered in individuals exhibiting signs and symptoms of poor heart contractility and/or valve disease in the presence of significant increases in blood eosinophil counts. Ancillary tests may help in the diagnosis. Echocardiography typically gives non-specific and only occasional findings of endocardium thickening, left ventricular hypertrophy, left ventricle dilation, and involvement of the mitral and/or tricuspid valves. Gadolinium-based cardiac magnetic resonance imaging is the most useful non-invasive procedure for diagnosing eosinophilic myocarditis. It supports this diagnosis if it shows at least two of the following abnormalities: a) an increased signal in T2-weighted images; b) an increased global myocardial early enhancement ratio between myocardial and skeletal muscle in enhanced T1 images and c) one or more focal enhancements distributed in a non-vascular pattern in late enhanced T1-weighted images. Additionally, and unlike in other forms of myocarditis, eosinophilic myocarditis may also show enhanced gadolinium uptake in the sub-endocardium. However, the only definitive test for Loeffler endocarditis is cardiac muscle biopsy showing the presence of eosinophilic infiltrates. Since the disorder may be patchy, multiple tissue samples taken during the procedure improve the chances of uncovering the pathology but in any case, negative results do not exclude the diagnosis.

== Treatment ==
Small studies and case reports have directed efforts towards: a) supporting cardiac function by relieving heart failure and suppressing life-threatening abnormal heart rhythms; b) suppressing eosinophil-based cardiac inflammation; and c) treating the underlying disorder. In all cases of Loeffler endocarditis that have no specific treatment regimens for the underlying disorder, available studies recommend treating the inflammatory component of this disorder with non-specific immunosuppressive drugs, principally high-dosage followed by slowly-tapering to low-dosage maintenance corticosteroid regimens. Afflicted individuals who fail this regimen or present with cardiogenic shock may benefit from treatment with other non-specific immunosuppressive drugs such as azathioprine or cyclophosphamide, as adjuncts to, or replacements for, corticosteroids. However, individuals with an underlying therapeutically accessible disease should be treated for this disease; in seriously symptomatic cases, such individuals may be treated concurrently with a corticosteroid regimen. Examples of diseases underlying Loefflers myocarditis that are recommended for treatments directed at the underlying disease include:

- Infectious agents: specific drug treatment of helminth and protozoan infections typically takes precedence over non-specific immunosuppressive therapy, which, if used without specific treatment, could worsen the infection. In moderate-to-severe cases, non-specific immunosuppression is used in combination with specific drug treatment.
- Toxic reactions to ingested agents: discontinuance of the ingested agent plus corticosteroids or other non-specific immunosuppressive regimens.
- Clonal eosinophilia caused by mutations in genes that are highly susceptible to tyrosine kinase inhibitors such as PDGFRA, PDGFRB, or possibly FGFR1: first generation tyrosine kinase inhibitors (e.g. imatinib) are recommended for the former two mutations; a later generation tyrosine kinase inhibitors, ponatinib, alone or combined with bone marrow transplantation, may be useful for treating the FGFR1 mutations.
- Clonal hypereosinophilia due to mutations in other genes or primary malignancies: specific treatment regimens used for these pre-malignant or malignant diseases may be more useful and necessary than non-specific immunosuppression.
- Allergic and autoimmune diseases: non-specific treatment regimens used for these diseases may be useful in place of a simple corticosteroid regimen. For example, eosinophilic granulomatosis with polyangiitis can be successfully treated with mepolizumab.
- Idiopathic hypereosinphilic syndrome and lymphocyte-variant hypereosinophilia: corticosteroids; for individuals with these hypereosinophilias that are refractory to or break through corticosteroid therapy and individuals requiring corticosteroid-sparing therapy, recommended alternative drug therapies include hydroxyurea, Pegylated interferon-α, and either one of the tyrosine kinase inhibitors imatinib and mepolizumab).

== See also ==
- Cardiomyopathy
- Eosinophilic myocarditis
