= Erythema annulare centrifugum =

Red, circular lesion on the skin

Erythema anulare centrifugum
- Other names: Deep gyrate erythema, Erythema perstans, Palpable migrating erythema and Superficial gyrate erythema
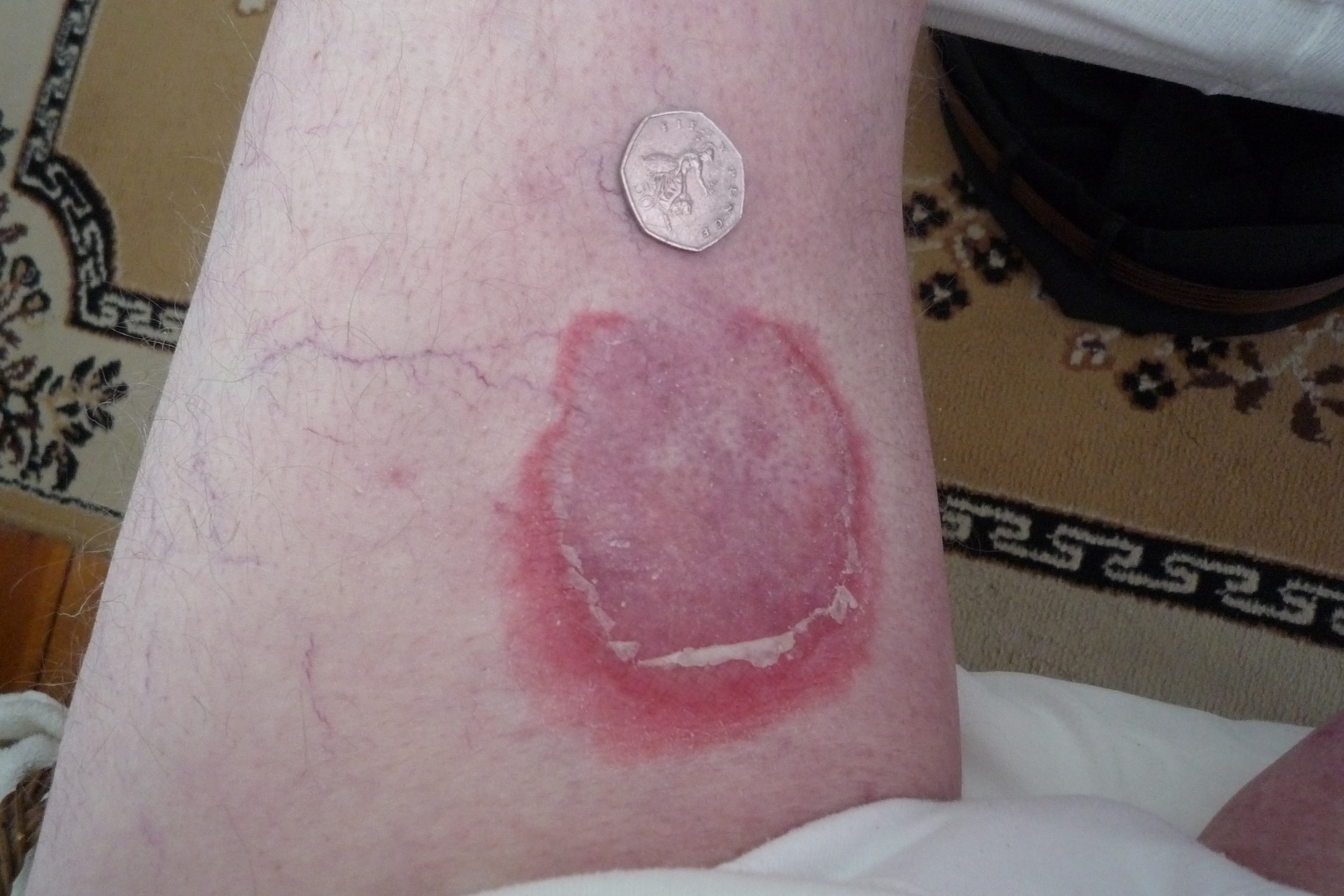
- Specialty: Dermatology

Erythema annulare centrifugum (EAC), is a descriptive term for a class of skin lesion presenting redness (erythema) in a ring form (anulare) that spreads from a center (centrifugum). It was first described by Darier in 1916. Many different terms have been used to classify these types of lesions and it is still controversial on what exactly defines EAC. Some of the types include annular erythema (deep and superficial), erythema perstans, erythema gyratum perstans, erythema gyratum repens, darier erythema (deep gyrate erythema) and erythema figuratum perstans.

== Symptoms ==
Occurring at any age these lesions appear as raised pink-red ring or bulls-eye marks. They range in size from 0.5–8 cm (0.20–3.15 in). The lesions sometimes increase size and spread over time and may not be complete rings but irregular shapes. Distribution is usually on the thighs and legs but can also appear on the upper extremities, areas not exposed to sunlight, trunk or face. Currently EAC is not known to be contagious, but as many cases are incorrectly diagnosed as EAC, it is difficult to be certain.

== Causes ==
Often no specific cause for the eruptions is found. However, it is sometimes linked to underlying diseases and conditions such as:

- Food (including blue cheese or tomatoes).
- Contact Dermatitis (i.e. cleaning agents, fabric softeners, etc.)
- Fungal, Bacterial and Viral infections such as sinusitis, tuberculosis, candidiasis or tinea.
- Drugs including finasteride, etizolam (and benzodiazepines), chloroquine, hydroxychloroquine, oestrogen, penicillin and amitriptyline.
- Cancer (especially the type known as erythema gyratum perstans, in which there are concentric and whirling rings).
- Primary biliary cirrhosis.
- Graves disease.
- Appendicitis.
- Lupus
- Pregnancy (EAC usually disappears/stops soon after delivery of baby).
- Hormone (Contraceptive Pill, Stress, Hormone Drugs)
- Lyme disease

== Diagnosis ==
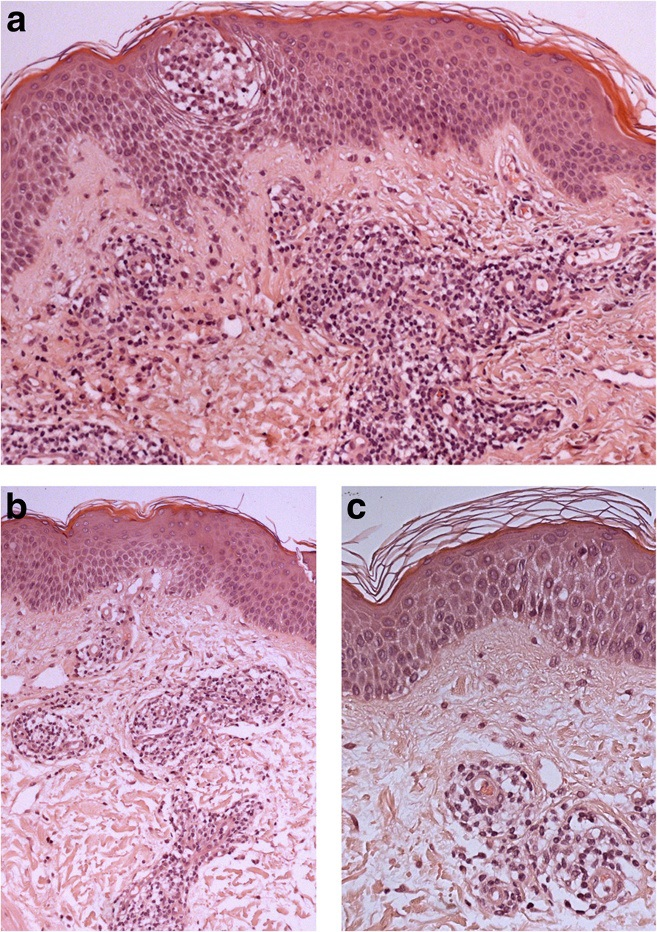
Micrograph of erythema annulare centrifugum, showing a moderately intense superficial perivascular dermal lymphohistiocytic infiltrate with rare eosinophils, edema of papillary dermis, hyperkeratosis and focal epidermal spongiosis.

A skin biopsy can be performed to test for EAC; tests should be performed to rule out other possible diseases such as: pityriasis rosea, tinea corporis, psoriasis, nummular eczema, atopic dermatitis, drug reaction, erythema migrans and other rashes.

Differential diagnosis

- Sarcoidosis
- Fungal infection
- Lupus erythematosus

== Treatment ==
No treatment is usually needed as they usually go away anywhere from months to years. The lesions may last from anywhere between 4 weeks to 34 years with an average duration of 11 months. If caused by an underlying disease or malignancy, then treating and removing the disease or malignancy will stop the lesions. It usually doesn't require treatment, but topical corticosteroids may be helpful in reducing redness, swelling and itchiness.

Some supported and not supported methods of having an effect on EAC include:

- Photosensitive so it can be moved/reduced with appropriate sunlight.
- Vitamin D
- Immune system - hence it will increase in size/number when the immune system is low or overloaded.
- Hormone Drugs
- Disulone
- Stress reduction
- Topical calcipotriol - a topical vitamin D derivative has been known to be beneficial

== Epidemiology ==
It is very rare and estimated to affect 1 in 100,000 per year. Because of its rarity the documentation, cases and information are sparse and not a huge amount is known for certain, meaning that EAC could actually be a set of many un-classified skin lesions. It is known to occur at all ages and all genders equally. Some articles state that women are more likely to be affected than men.

== See also ==
- List of cutaneous conditions
