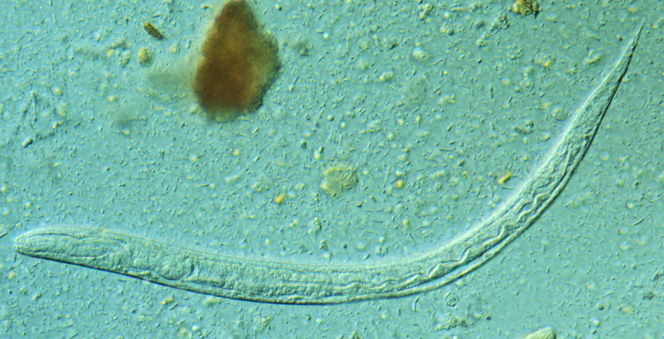
- First stage larva (L1) of S. stercoralis

Scientific classification
- Kingdom: Animalia
- Phylum: Nematoda
- Class: Chromadorea
- Order: Rhabditida
- Family: Strongylidae
- Genus: Strongyloides
- Species: S. stercoralis

Binomial name
- Strongyloides stercoralis (Bavay, 1876)

Synonyms
- Anguillula stercoralis Bavay, 1876

= Strongyloides stercoralis =

Threadworm

Species of worm

Strongyloides stercoralis is a human pathogenic parasitic roundworm causing the disease strongyloidiasis. Its common name in the US is threadworm. In the UK and Australia, however, the term threadworm can also refer to nematodes of the genus Enterobius, otherwise known as pinworms.

The Strongyloides stercoralis nematode can parasitize humans. The adult parasitic stage lives in tunnels in the mucosa of the small intestine. The genus Strongyloides contains 53 species, and S. stercoralis is the type species. S. stercoralis has been reported in other mammals, including cats and dogs. However, it seems that the species in dogs is typically not S. stercoralis, but the related species S. canis. Non-human primates are more commonly infected with S. fuelleborni and S. cebus, although S. stercoralis has been reported in captive primates. Other species of Strongyloides that are naturally parasitic in humans, but with restricted distributions, are S. fuelleborni fuelleborni in central Africa and S. fuelleborni kellyi in Papua New Guinea.

== Geographic distribution ==
S. stercoralis infection is associated with fecal contamination of soil or water. Hence, it is a very rare infection in developed economies. In developing countries, it is less prevalent in urban areas than in rural areas (where sanitation standards are poor). S. stercoralis can be found in areas with tropical and subtropical climates.

Strongyloidiasis was first described in the 19th century in French soldiers returning home from expeditions in Indochina. Today, the countries of the old Indochina (Vietnam, Cambodia, and Laos) still have endemic strongyloidiasis, with the typical prevalences being 10% or less. Regions of Japan used to have endemic strongyloidiasis, but control programs have eliminated the disease. Strongyloidiasis appears to have a high prevalence in some areas of Brazil and Central America. It is endemic in Africa, but the prevalence is typically low (1% or less). Pockets have been reported from rural Italy, but the current status is unknown. In the Pacific islands, strongyloidiasis is rare, although some cases have been reported from Fiji. In tropical Australia, some rural and remote Australian Aboriginal communities have very high prevalences of strongyloidiasis.

In some African countries (e.g., Congo), S. fuelleborni was more common than S. stercoralis in parasite surveys from the 1970s, but the current status is unknown. In Papua New Guinea, S. stercoralis is endemic, but prevalence is low. However, in some areas, another species, S. kellyi, is a very common parasite of children in the New Guinea Highlands and Western Province.

Estimates of the number of people infected vary with one estimate putting the figure at 370 million worldwide. Local prevalence can exceed 40% in some tropical and subtropical countries.

== Life cycle ==
The life cycle of this parasite is more complex than that of most nematodes, with its alternation between free-living and parasitic cycles, and its potential for autoinfection (the parasite has the ability to complete its life cycle without the involvement of another host) and multiplication within the host. The parasitic cycle is homogonic, while the free-living cycle is heterogonic. The heterogonic life cycle is advantageous to the parasite because it allows reproduction in the absence of a host.

In the free-living cycle, the rhabditiform larvae passed in the stool can either molt twice and become infective filariform larvae (direct development) or molt four times and become free-living adult males and females that mate and produce eggs from which rhabditiform larvae hatch. In the direct development, first-stage larvae (L1) transform into infective larvae (IL) via three molts. The indirect route results first in the development of free-living adults that mate; the female lays eggs, which hatch and then develop into IL. The direct route gives IL faster (three days) versus the indirect route (seven to 10 days). However, the indirect route results in an increase in the number of IL produced. Speed of development of IL is traded for increased numbers. The free-living males and females of S. stercoralis die after one generation; they do not persist in the soil. The latter, in turn, can either develop into a new generation of free-living adults or develop into infective filariform larvae. The filariform larvae penetrate the human host skin to initiate the parasitic cycle. Upon contact with contaminated soil, infectious larvae contained in the soil can penetrate the skin.

Some of the larvae enter the superficial veins and are carried in the blood to the lungs, where they enter the alveoli. They are then coughed up and swallowed into the gut, where they parasitise the intestinal mucosa of the duodenum and jejunum. In the small intestine, they molt twice and become adult female worms. The females live threaded in the epithelium of the small intestine and, by parthenogenesis, produce eggs, which yield rhabditiform larvae. Only females will reach reproductive adulthood in the intestine. Female strongyloids reproduce through parthenogenesis. The eggs hatch in the intestine and young larvae are then excreted in the feces. It takes about two weeks to reach egg development from the initial skin penetration. By this process, S. stercoralis can cause both respiratory and gastrointestinal symptoms. The worms also participate in autoinfection, in which the rhabditiform larvae become infective filariform larvae, which can penetrate either the intestinal mucosa (internal autoinfection) or the skin of the perianal area (external autoinfection); in either case, the filariform larvae may follow the previously described route, being carried successively to the lungs, the bronchial tree, the pharynx, and the small intestine, where they mature into adults; or they may disseminate widely in the body. To date, occurrence of autoinfection in humans with helminthic infections is recognized only in Strongyloides stercoralis and Capillaria philippinensis infections. In the case of Strongyloides, autoinfection may explain the possibility of persistent infections for many years in persons not having been in an endemic area and of hyperinfections in immunodepressed individuals.

== Zoonotic transmission ==
Dogs can act as a host for this parasite both in the wild and in the laboratory, but transmission from dog to human has been difficult to prove. Molecular genetic analyses have shown that there are two populations of this parasite in dogs, one of which (type B) is exclusive to dogs and a second (type A) that is common to dogs and humans. These two genotypes may be separate species. The identity of the genes suggests that dog to human transmission may occur.

== Morphology ==
Whereas males grow to only about 0.9 mm (0.04 in) in length, females can grow from 2.0 to 2.5 mm (0.08 to 0.10 in). Both sexes also possess a tiny buccal capsule and cylindrical esophagus without a posterior bulb. In the free-living stage, the esophagi of both sexes are rhabditiform. Males can be distinguished from females by two structures: the spicules and gubernaculum.

== Autoinfection ==
An unusual feature of S. stercoralis is autoinfection. Only one other species in the genus Strongyloides, S. felis, has this trait. Autoinfection is the development of L1 into small infective larvae in the gut of the host. These autoinfective larvae penetrate the wall of the lower ileum or colon or the skin of the perianal region, enter the circulation again, travel to the lungs, and then to the small intestine, thus repeating the cycle. Autoinfection makes strongyloidiasis due to S. stercoralis an infection with several unusual features.

Persistence of infection is the first of these important features. Because of autoinfection, humans have been known to still be infected up to 65 years after they were first exposed to the parasite (e.g., World War II or Vietnam War veterans). Once a host is infected with S. stercoralis, infection is lifelong unless effective treatment eliminates all adult parasites and migrating autoinfective larvae.

== Symptoms ==
Many people infected are asymptomatic at first. Symptoms include dermatitis: swelling, itching, larva currens, and mild hemorrhage at the site where the skin has been penetrated. Spontaneous scratch-like lesions may be seen on the face or elsewhere. If the parasite reaches the lungs, the chest may feel as if it is burning, and wheezing and coughing may result, along with pneumonia-like symptoms (Löffler's syndrome). The intestines could eventually be invaded, leading to burning pain, tissue damage, sepsis, and ulcers. Stools may have yellow mucus with a recognizable smell. Chronic diarrhea can be a symptom. In severe cases, edema may result in obstruction of the intestinal tract, as well as loss of peristaltic contractions.

Strongyloidiasis in immunocompetent individuals is usually an indolent disease. However, in immunocompromised individuals, it can cause a hyperinfective syndrome (also called disseminated strongyloidiasis) due to the reproductive capacity of the parasite inside the host. This hyperinfective syndrome can have a mortality rate close to 90% if disseminated.

Immunosuppressive drugs, especially corticosteroids and agents used for tissue transplantation, can increase the rate of autoinfection to the point where an overwhelming number of larvae migrate through the lungs, which in many cases can prove fatal. In addition, diseases such as human T-lymphotropic virus 1, which enhance the Th1 arm of the immune system and lessen the Th2 arm, increase the disease state. Another consequence of autoinfection is the autoinfective larvae can carry gut bacteria back into the body. About 50% of people with hyperinfection present with bacterial disease due to enteric bacteria. Also, a unique effect of autoinfective larvae is larva currens due to the rapid migration of the larvae through the skin. Larva currens appears as a red line that moves rapidly (more than 5 cm or 2 in per day), and then quickly disappears. It is pathognomonic for autoinfective larvae and can be used as a diagnostic criterion for strongyloidiasis due to S. stercoralis.

== Diagnosis ==
Locating juvenile larvae, either rhabditiform or filariform, in recent stool samples will confirm the presence of this parasite. Other techniques used include direct fecal smears, culturing fecal samples on agar plates, serodiagnosis through ELISA, and duodenal fumigation. Still, diagnosis can be difficult because of the day-to-day variation in juvenile parasite load.

== Prevention ==
Ideally, prevention, by improved sanitation (proper disposal of feces), practicing good hygiene (washing of hands), etc., is used before any drug regimen is administered.

== Treatment ==
Ivermectin is the drug of choice for treatment, due to its low side effect profile. Albendazole is also effective in treating strongyloidiasis. Mebendazole has a much higher failure rate in clinical practice than albendazole or ivermectin. However, these drugs have little effect on the autoinfective larvae. Hence, repeat treatments with ivermectin or albendazole must be administered to kill newly matured parasites that have developed from the autoinfective larvae. This means a full treatment dose every two weeks until all larvae capable of maturing into adults have been extirpated. Follow-up stool samples, potential additional treatment, and blood tests are necessary to ensure a cure.

== Chemoattractant ==
This parasite depends on chemical cues to find a potential host. It uses sensor neurons of class AFD to identify cues excreted by the host. S. stercoralis is attracted to nonspecific attractants of warmth, carbon dioxide, and sodium chloride. Urocanic acid, a component of skin secretions in mammals, is a major chemoattractant. Larvae of S. stercoralis are strongly attracted to this compound. This compound can be suppressed by metal ions, suggesting a possible strategy for preventing infection.

Strongyloides is thought to be attracted to humans via paired thermosensory neurons. While S. stercoralis is attracted to chemicals such as carbon dioxide or sodium chloride, these chemicals are not specific. Larvae have been thought to locate their hosts via chemicals in the skin, the predominant one being urocanic acid, a histidine metabolite on the uppermost layer of skin that is removed by sweat or the daily skin-shedding cycle. Urocanic acid concentrations can achieve at least fivefold greater levels on the foot sole than any other part of the human body.

== See also ==
- List of parasites (human)
- Larva currens
