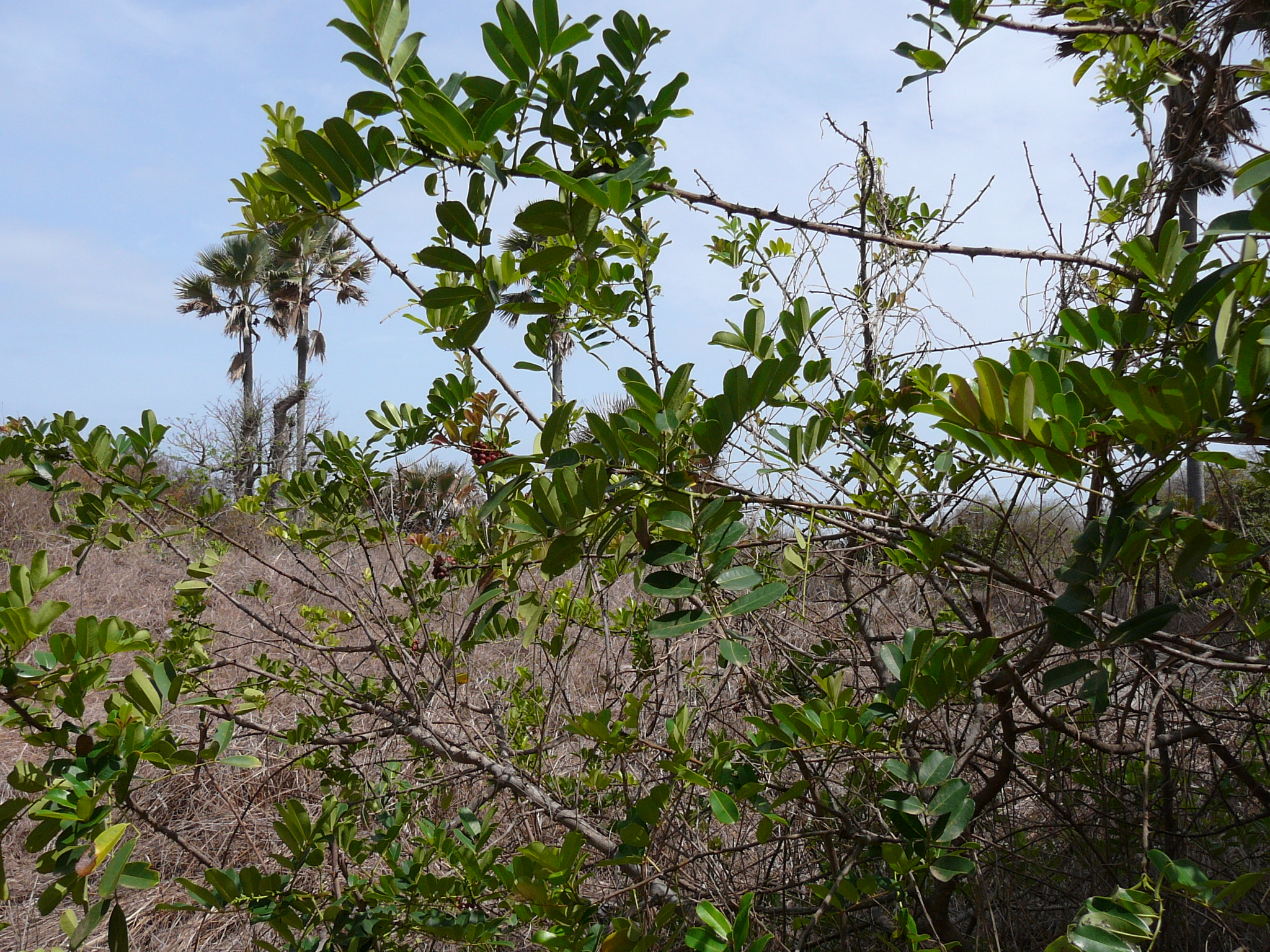

Scientific classification
- Kingdom: Plantae
- Clade: Tracheophytes
- Clade: Angiosperms
- Clade: Eudicots
- Clade: Rosids
- Order: Sapindales
- Family: Rutaceae
- Genus: Zanthoxylum
- Species: Z. zanthoxyloides

Binomial name
- Zanthoxylum zanthoxyloides (Lam.) Zepern. & Timler, 1981

Synonyms
- Fagara zanthoxyloides Lam. Zanthoxylum senegalense DC.

= Zanthoxylum zanthoxyloides =

Species of flowering plant

Zanthoxylum zanthoxyloides, also called Senegal prickly-ash or artar root, is a plant species in the genus Zanthoxylum.

The plant contains isomeric divanilloylquinic acids (3,4-O-divanilloylquinic acid or burkinabin A, 3,5-O-divanilloylquinic acid or burkinabin B and 4,5-O-divanilloylquinic acid or burkinabin C). Burkinabin C, a type of hydrolysable tannin can be found in the root bark of F. zanthoxyloides. It also contains fagaronine, a benzophenanthridine alkaloid.

A study by Williams, Soelberg and Jäger (2016) showed than ethanolic extracts of Z. zanthoxyloides have in vitro anthelmintic properties against the nematode Ascaris suum, a swine parasite that is closely related to the human parasite A. lumbricoides. The half maximal effective concentration (EC50) values were 94 μg/mL and 132 μg/mL, for roots and root bark, respectively. The authors concluded that these results encourage further investigation of the use of this plant as complementary treatment options for ascariasis.

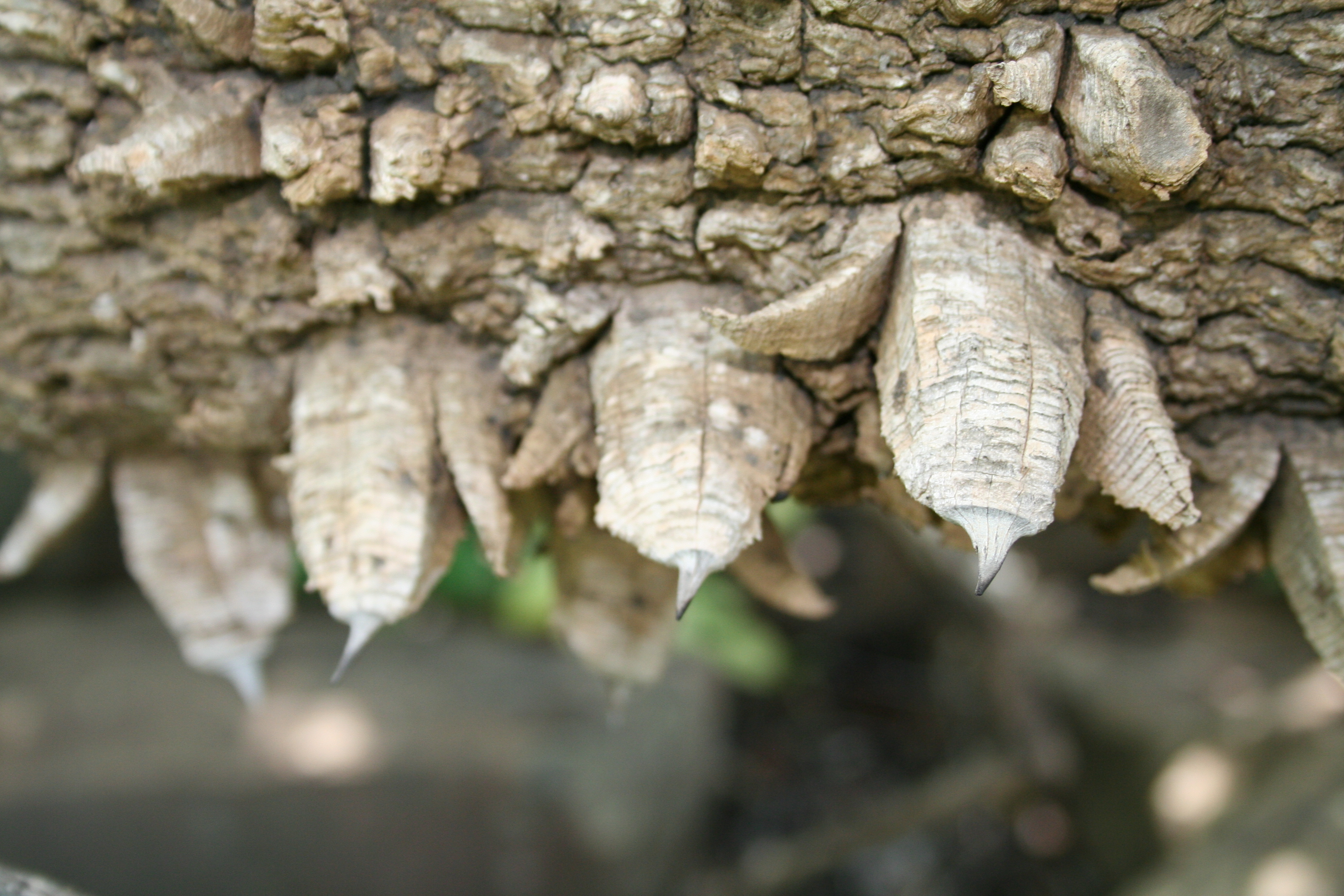
Spines

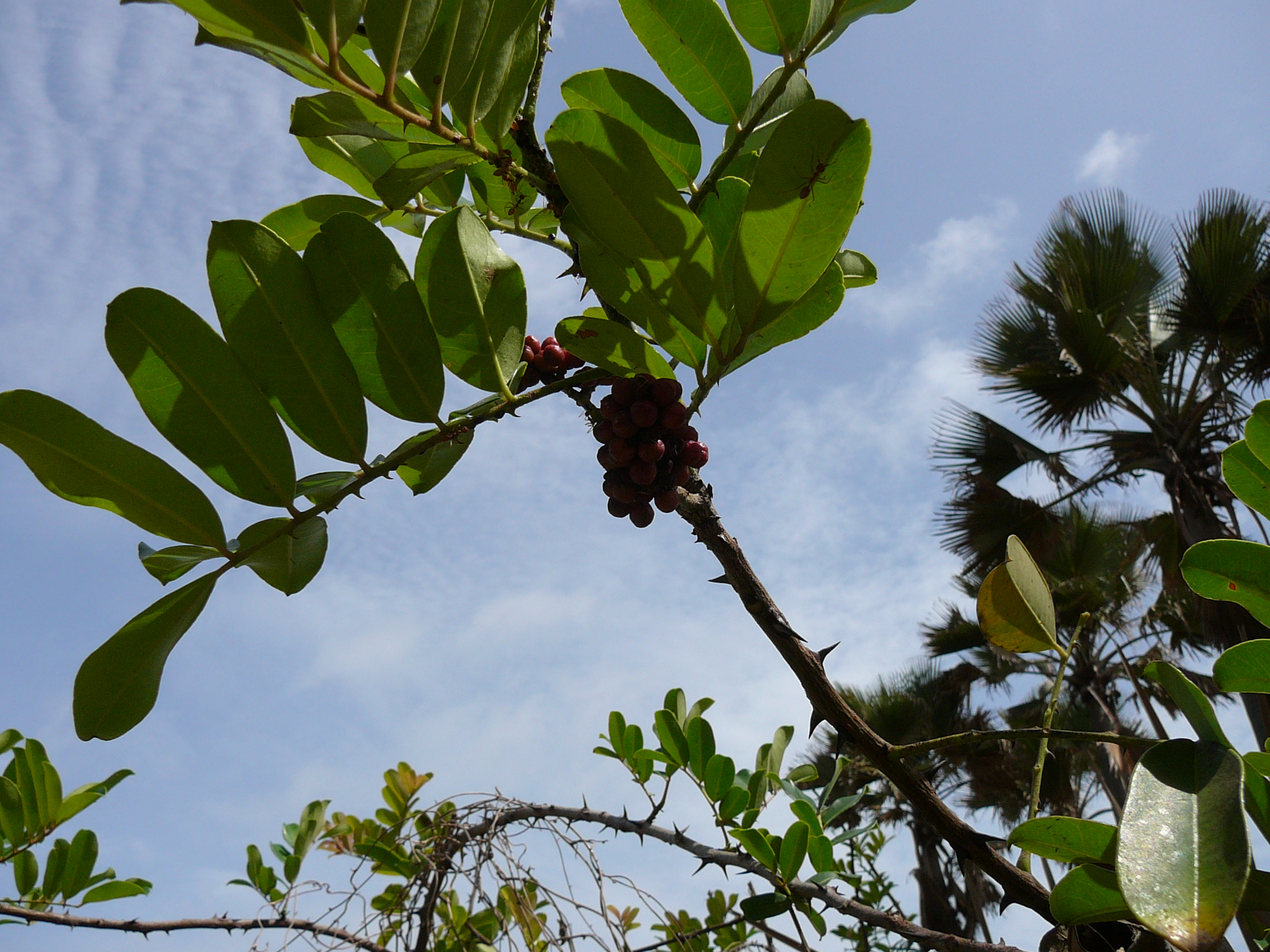
Fruits

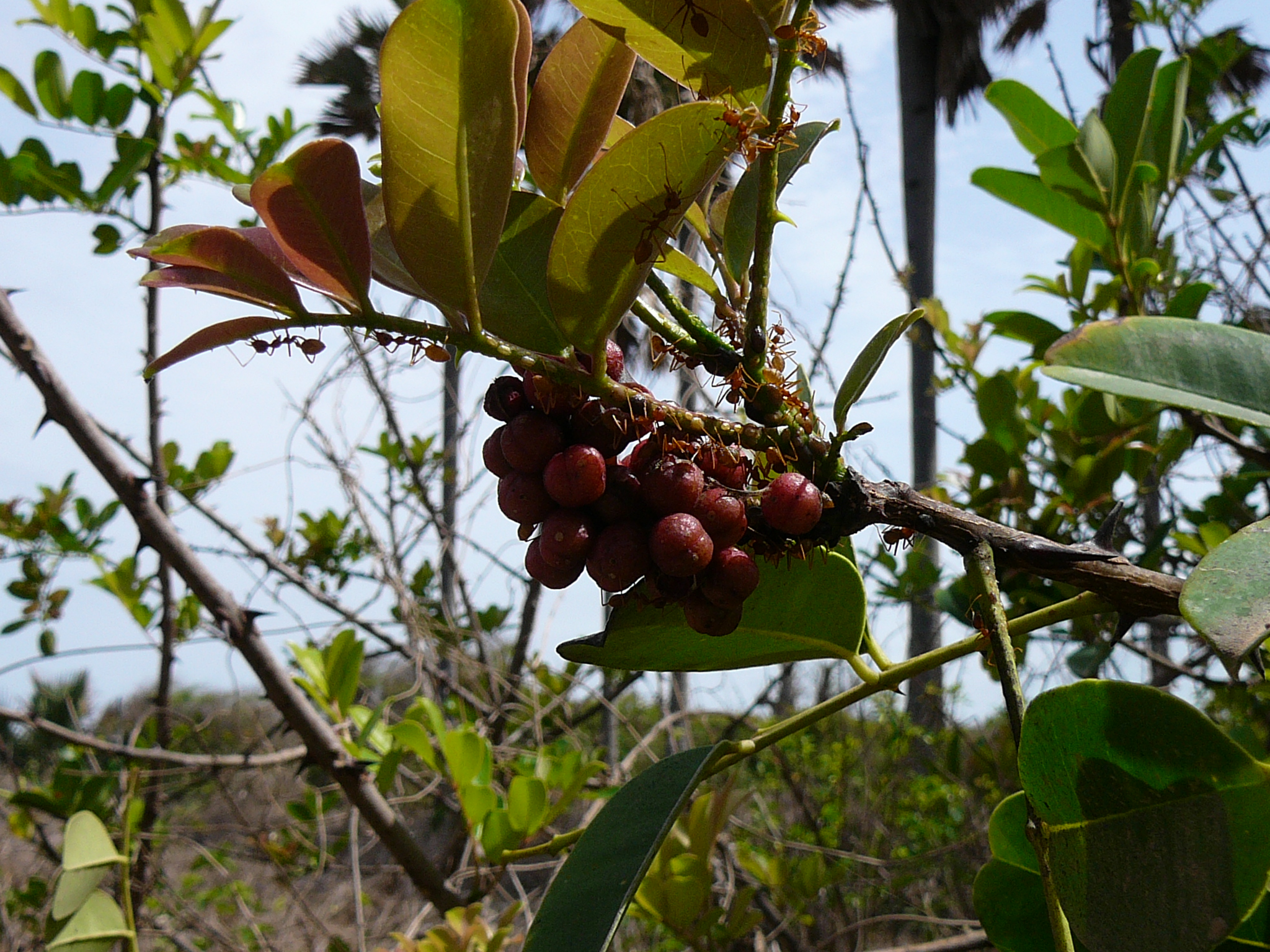
Fruits
