= Hexametra boddaertii =

Scientific classification
- Kingdom: Animalia
- Phylum: Nematoda
- Class: Chromadorea
- Order: Rhabditida
- Family: Ascarididae
- Genus: Hexametra
- Species: H. boddaertii

Binomial name
- Hexametra boddaertii Baird, 1860

Species of roundworm

Hexametra boddaertii is a parasitic roundworm belonging to the family Ascarididae. H. boddaertii was originally described from a single specimen of Mastigodryas boddaerti, a South American colubrine snake. Other neotropical colubrids identified as hosts to H. boddaertii include Oxyrhopus trigeminus, Philodryas patagoniensis, Spilotes pullatus, Trimorphodon biscutatus, Philodryas baroni, and Oxyrhopus guibei. It is thought that Hexametra may be the causative agent of ocular disease, diffuse unilateral subacute neuroretinitis, (DSUN), in Brazil.
