= Parascaris univalens =

Scientific classification
- Domain: Eukaryota
- Kingdom: Animalia
- Phylum: Nematoda
- Class: Chromadorea
- Order: Ascaridida
- Family: Ascarididae
- Genus: Parascaris
- Species: P. univalens

Binomial name
- Parascaris univalens

Species of roundworm

Parascaris univalens is a parasitic ascaridoid nematode that infects the gastrointestinal tracts of equines.

== Taxonomy ==
P. univalens is morphologically identical to Parascaris equorum, the only other species in the genus. The species are distinguished by the number of chromosomes. Karyotyping is the only way to differentiate between the two: P. univalens has one pair of chromosomes and P. equorum has two pairs. However, new genomic research suggests that both Parascaris species could be the same species. Both species are model organisms for chromosome organization and cell division.

== Description ==
The species is yellow-white in color, with adults having a long body and a broad anterior end that has three shamrock-like lips. Adult females can reach up to 50 cm in length and be 1–2 cm round. As with other ascarid worms, P. univalens is known to increase in size as it ages.

These worms are host-specific to equines and cannot infect humans or other animals.

P. univalens is a model organism for chromatin diminution.

== Life cycle ==
A protein layer surrounding most of the eggs enables them to stick to vertical surfaces and even to the hair and udder or a mare. Foals are especially susceptible to infection because they like to explore the environment with their mouths, and when they are weaning off their mothers.

Females will lay eggs that are then passed out of the equine through their feces, but those eggs are not infectious yet. Only under the right environmental conditions can the eggs become infectious; which is an egg that contains a coiled, third stage larva. This process can happen within two weeks after being passed out of the equine.

As an infectious egg is ingested it loses its protective coat when passing through the digestive system. The larva will emerge from the egg in the small intestine and proceed to pierce the intestinal lining. The larva will travel through the lymphatic system from the small intestine to the liver, which can usually take 2 to 7 days after the initial infection. The larvae continue moving through the functional tissue, or parenchyma, of the liver, causing inflammatory problems. Around two weeks post-infection stage 3 larva will have reached the lungs. They will live in the lungs for another two weeks before finally erupting out of the alveolar membranes to enter the airways. Four weeks post-infection is where they are coughed up into the pharynx and swallowed, returning to the small intestine to mature and reproduce. Adult P. univalens may live in the small intestine for many months and lay eggs anywhere from 90 –110 days after the initial infection. Eggs are then shed through the equines feces where the process can continue.

== Clinical signs of infestation ==
Young equines, or foals, are most at risk of being infected whereas adults have built a tolerance to the nematode. Some signs and symptoms that the foals are infected with P. univalens include a lack of energy, coughing and nasal discharge. Some cases include impaired growth of foals and worm impaction can cause the small intestine to rupture. Intestinal impactions usually occur in foals and around four to ten months of age, additionally impactions can be diagnosed with an abdominal ultrasound.

== Treatment ==
Standard treatment for Parascarsis involves using drugs that induce paralysis in the worms, this makes them detach from the intestines and allow the horse to pass them. In some cases, surgery can be the only option to remove the worms.

Since older foals develop immunity to P. univalens, treatment is advised at two to five months old. A recent study on ascarids in Europe has discovered that P. univalens have started becoming resistant to a standard antihelmintic medication, pyrantel, whereas fenbendazole is still proven to be effective at removing the worms. Other medications frequently used include ivermectin and moxidectin. The use of such medications can cause issues if given to a foal later than suggested. Larger and a higher quantity of worms being treated with paralytic medicine can lead to impaction in the foal.
