= Ascaricide =

Antiparasitic drugs to treat ascariasis

Ascaricides are drugs to treat ascariasis that is caused by infections with parasitic nematodes (roundworms) of the genus Ascaris (giant intestinal roundworms). The large roundworm of pigs (Ascaris suum) typically infects pigs while Ascaris lumbricoides affects human populations, typically in sub-tropical and tropical areas with poor sanitation. Ascaricides belong to the group of drugs collectively called anthelmintics which expel parasitic worms (helminths) and other internal parasites from the body by either stunning or killing them and without causing significant damage to the host.

== Types ==
Common ascaricides include:

- Mebendazole (Vermox), causes slow immobilization and death of the worms by selectively and irreversibly blocking uptake of glucose and other nutrients in susceptible adult intestine where helminths dwell. Oral dosage is 100 mg every 12 hours for 3 days.
- Piperazine, a flaccid paralyzing agent that causes a blocking response of ascaris muscle to acetylcholine. The narcotizing effect immobilizes the worm, which prevents migration when treatment is accomplished with weak drugs such as thiabendazole. If used by itself it causes the worm to be passed out in the feces. Dosage is 75 mg/kg (max 3.5 g) as a single oral dose.
- Pyrantel pamoate (Antiminth, Pin-Rid, Pin-X), depolarizes ganglionic block of nicotinic neuromuscular transmission, resulting in spastic paralysis of the worm. Spastic (tetanic) paralyzing agents, in particular pyrantel pamoate, may induce complete intestinal obstruction in a heavy worm load. Dosage is 11 mg/kg not to exceed 1 g as a single dose.
- Albendazole, a broad-spectrum antihelminthic agent that decreases ATP production in the worm, causing energy depletion, immobilization, and finally death. Dosage is 400 mg given as single oral dose (contraindicated during pregnancy and children under 2 years).
- Thiabendazole, may cause migration of the worm into the esophagus, so it is usually combined with piperazine.
- Hexylresorcinol, effective in single dose
- Santonin, the primary drug of choice from the 1830s until around 1950 when it was replaced by safer compounds. It is more toxic than hexylresorcinol.
- Oil of chenopodium, more toxic than hexylresorcinol

== See also ==
- Parasite
- Ascariasis
