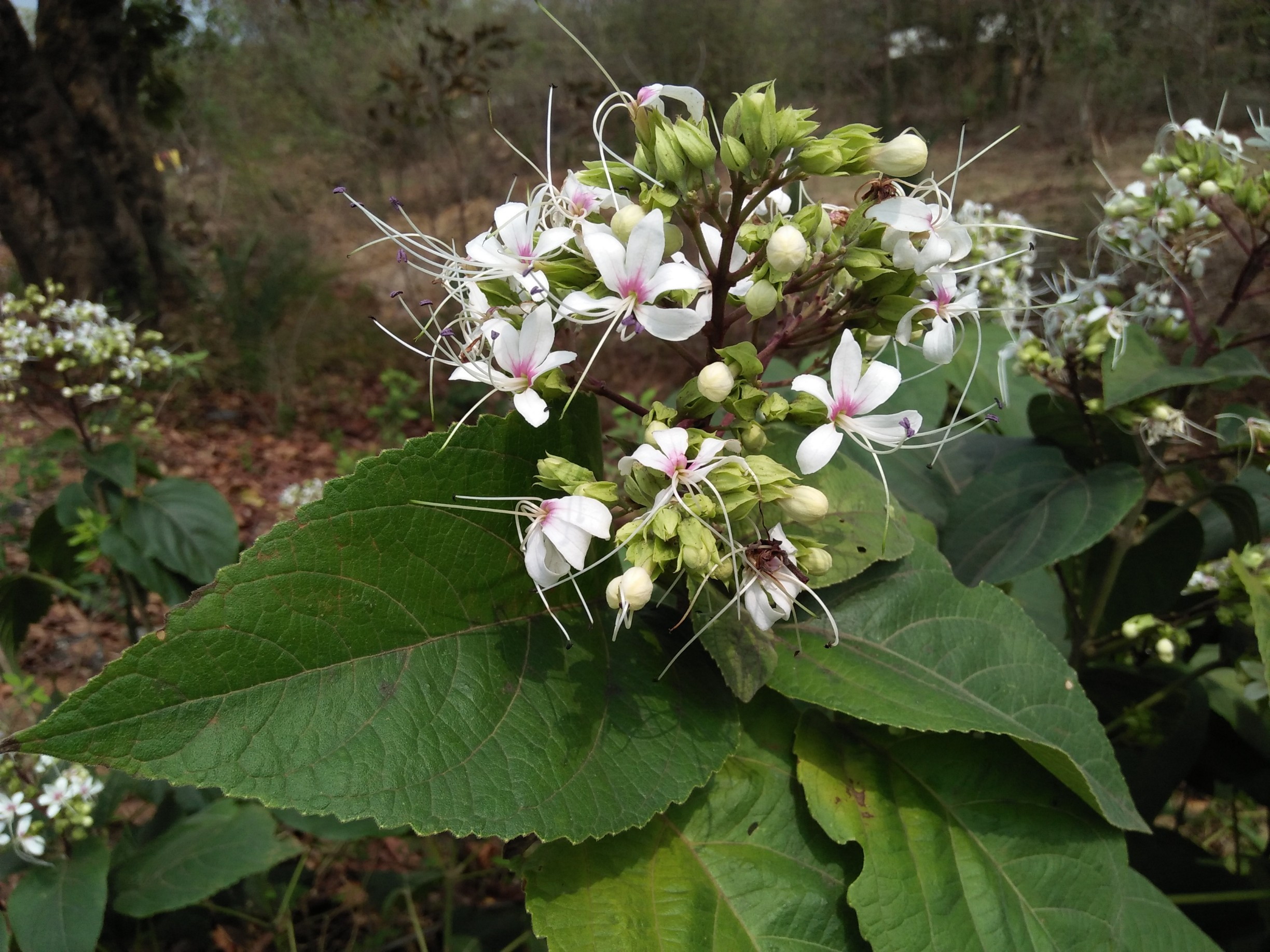

Scientific classification
- Kingdom: Plantae
- Clade: Tracheophytes
- Clade: Angiosperms
- Clade: Eudicots
- Clade: Asterids
- Order: Lamiales
- Family: Lamiaceae
- Genus: Clerodendrum
- Species: C. infortunatum

Binomial name
- Clerodendrum infortunatum L.

Synonyms
- Clerodendrum viscosum Vent.; Clerodendrum calycinum Turcz.

= Clerodendrum infortunatum =

Species of flowering plant

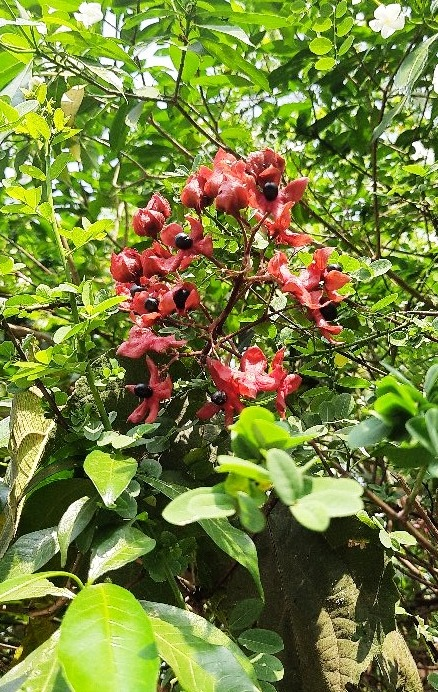
Berries of Clerodendrum infortunatum at Beliatore, India

Clerodendrum infortunatum, known as bhat or hill glory bower, is a perennial shrub belonging to the family Lamiaceae, also sometimes classified under Verbenaceae. It is the type species among ~150 species of Clerodendrum. It is one of the most well-known natural health remedies in traditional practices and siddha medicine.

The species is native to tropical regions of Asia including Bangladesh, India, Myanmar, Pakistan, Thailand, Malaysia, the Andaman Islands, and Sri Lanka.

== Description ==
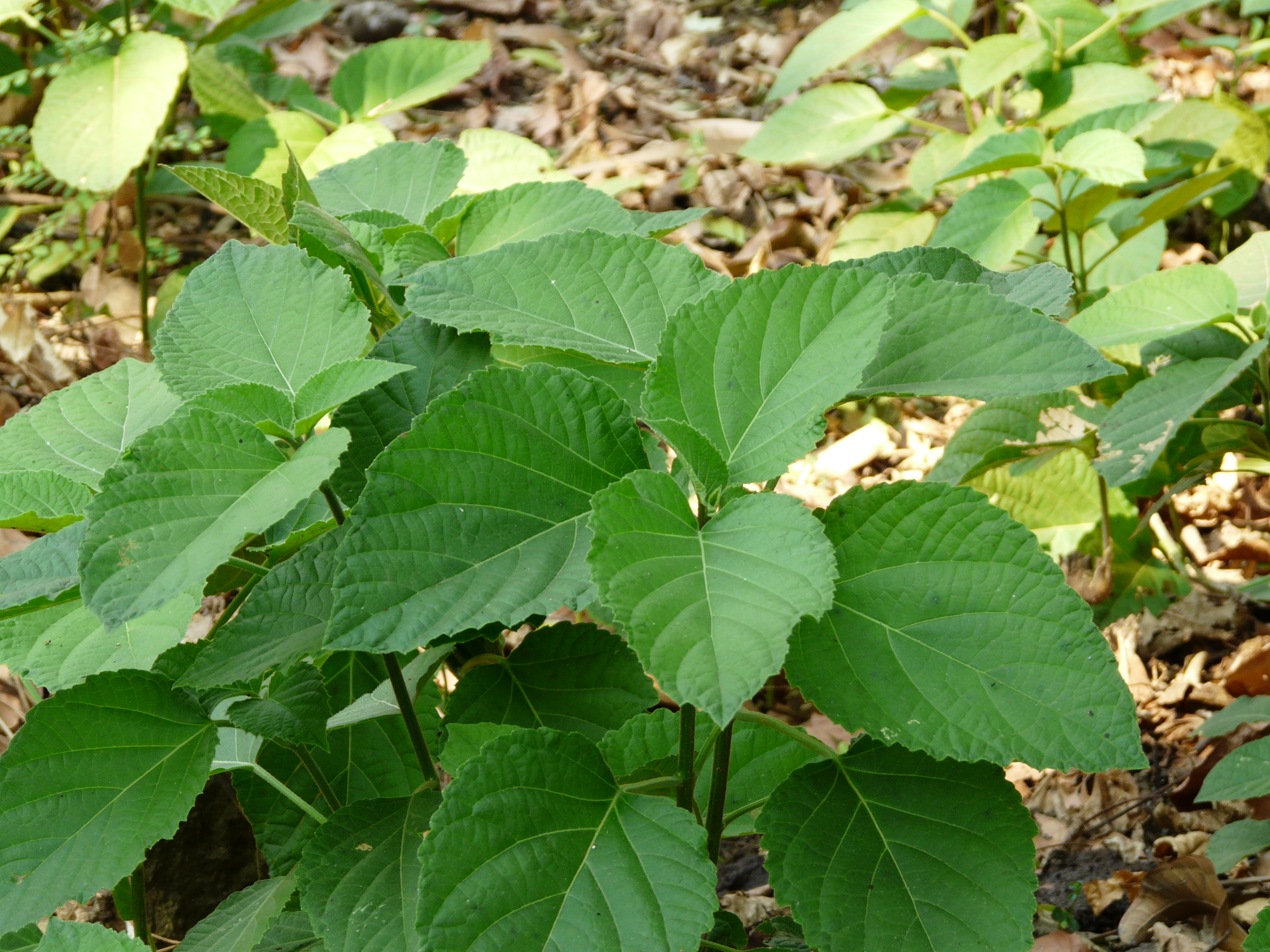
Clerodendrum infortunatum

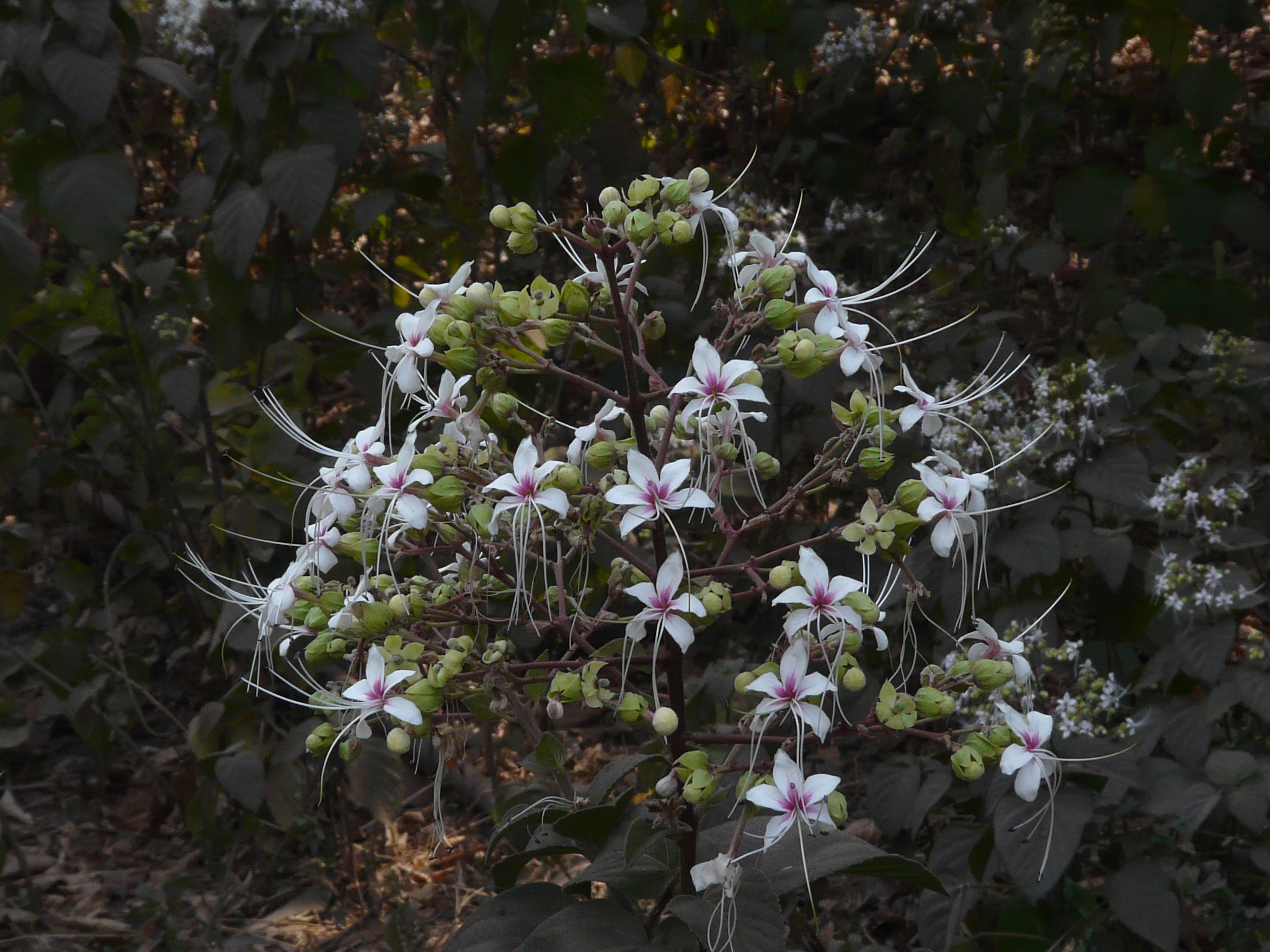
Inflorescence with blooming flowers

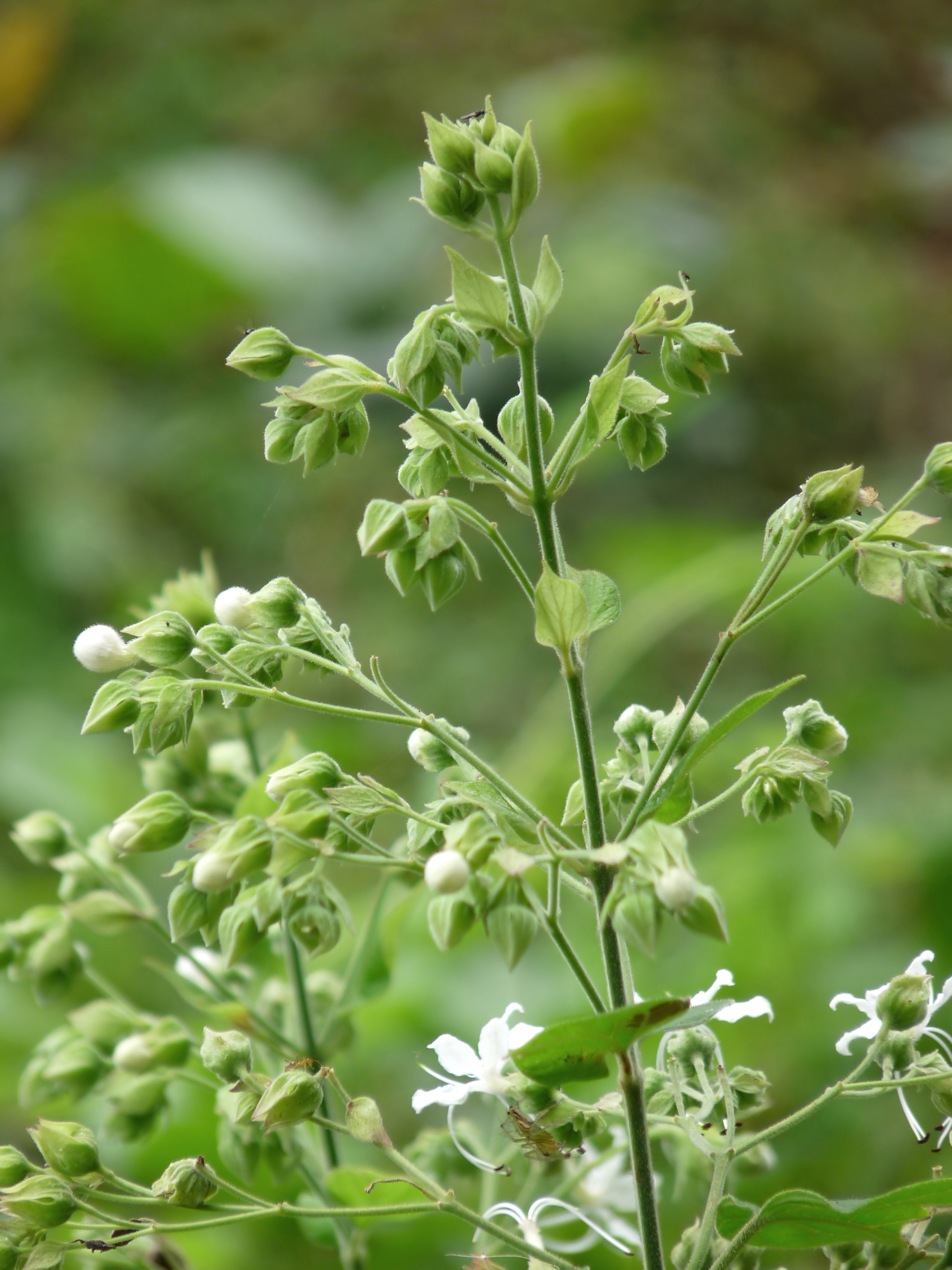
Inflorescence of Clerodendrum infortunatum

Clerodendrum infortunatum is a flowering shrub or small tree, and is so named because of its rather ugly leaf. The stem is erect, 0.5–4 m (1.6–13.1 ft) high, with no branches, and produces circular leaves with 15 cm (5.9 in) diameter. Leaves are simple, opposite; both surfaces sparsely villous-pubescent, elliptic, broadly elliptic, ovate or elongate ovate, 3.5–20 cm (1.4–7.9 in) wide, 6–25 cm (2.4–9.8 in) long, dentate, inflorescence in the terminal, peduncled, few-flowered cyme; flowers white with purplish pink or dull-purple throat, pubescent. Fruit berry, globose, turned bluish-black or black when ripe, enclosed in the red accrescent fruiting-calyx. The stem is hollow, and the leaves are 15–20 cm (5.9–7.9 in) long and borne in whorls of four on very short petioles. The inflorescence is huge, consisting of many tubular snow white flowers in a terminal cluster up to 0.6 m (2 ft) long. The tubes of the flowers are about 10 cm (3.9 in) long and droop downward, and the expanded corollas are about 5 cm (2.0 in) across.

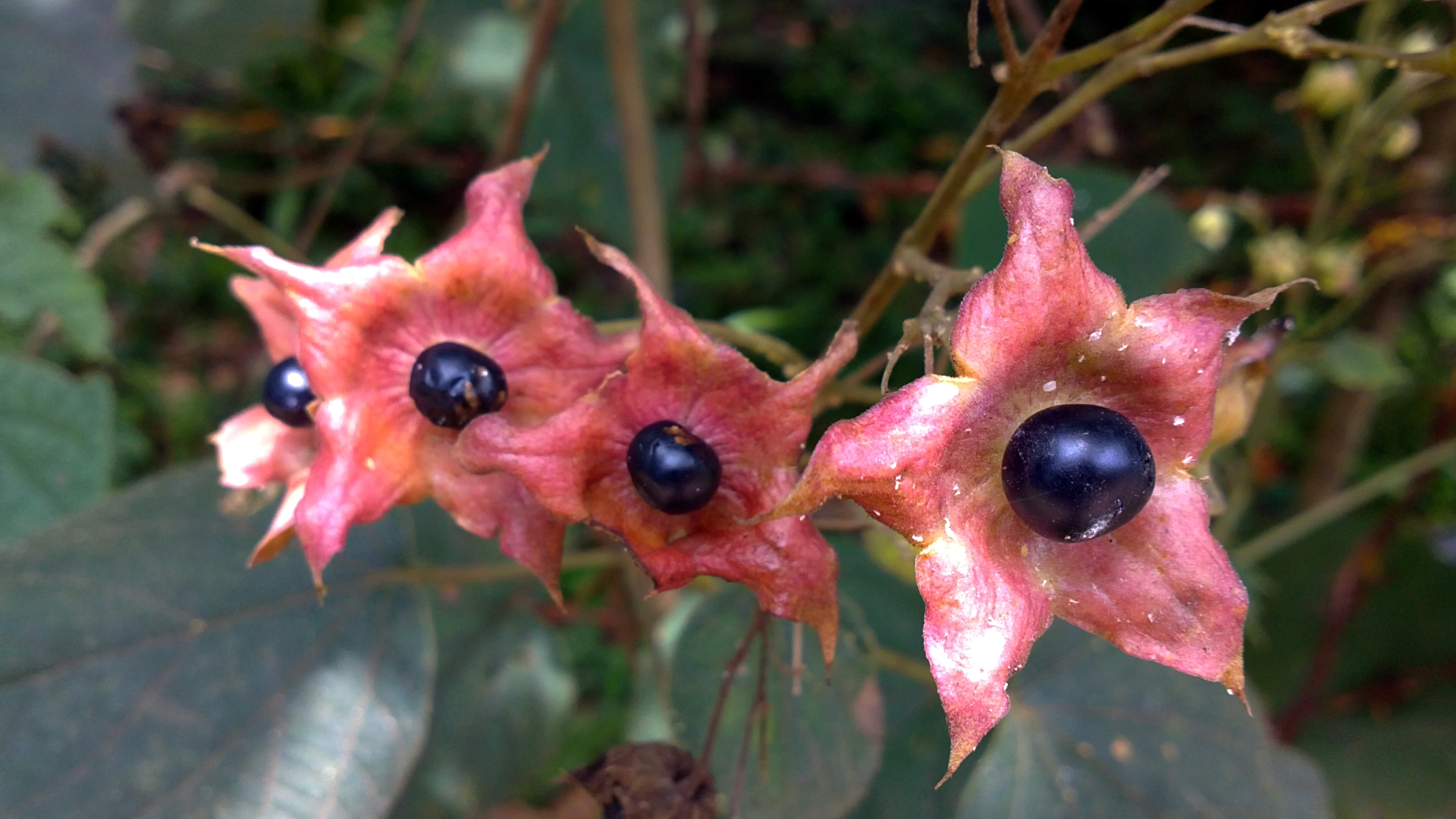
Ripe fruits of Clerodendrum infortunatum

The fruits are attractive dark metallic blue drupes, about 1 cm (0.4 in) in diameter. The fruit usually has four dry nutlets, and the seeds may have or may not have endosperm. It flowers from April to August.

== Chemical constituents ==
The major compounds are sterols, sugars, flavonoids and saponins. Novel crystalline compounds such as clerodolone, clerodone, clerodol, and a sterol designated clerosterol have been isolated from the root. Seven sugars namely raffinose, lactose, maltose, sucrose, galactose, glucose and fructose were identified. Fumaric acid, caffeic acid esters, β-sitosterol and β-sitosterol glucoside were isolated from the flowers. Apigenin, acacetin and a new flavone glycoside, characterised as the methyl ester of acacetin-7-0-glucuronide are isolated from the flowers. Saponin is one of the major compounds of the leaf. 24 beta-ethylsterols, clerosterol and 22-dehydroclerosterol, 24-methyl-sterols (24-methylcholestanol, 24-methylcholesterol, 24-methyl-22-dehydrocholesterol, and 24-methyllathostero) and 24 beta-ethyl-22-dehydrocholestanol are found in the seeds. Scutellarin and hispidulin-7-O-glucuronide are present in the leaf. Poriferasterol and stigmasterol are the components of the aerial parts.

== Traditional herbal medicine ==
Clerodendrum infortunatum is used in Ayurvedic and Siddha traditional medicines. Fresh leaves are given for diarrhea, liver disorders, and headache. The leaf and root are used as antidandruff, antipyretic, ascaricide, laxative, vermifuge, anticonvulsant, antidiabetic, and for gravel, malaria, scabies, skin diseases, sores, spasm, scorpion sting, snake bite, and tumors. In many traditional practices the leaves and root are widely used as antihyperglycemic.
