= 1970 ascariasis poisoning incident =

Poisoning incident with pig ascarid roundworm in Quebec

The 1970 ascariasis poisoning incident was a poisoning incident that took place in Quebec in February, 1970. At least seven people claimed to have been infected with parasitic worm eggs by Eric Kranz, a former postgraduate student from Hempstead, New York. The victims were Canadians Richard Davis, William Butler, David Fisk, and Keith Fern, with three other friends and acquaintances reported to be mildly infested. Doctors said that one of the men may have been affected by as many as 400,000 larvae.

Eric Kranz was a 23-year-old postdoctoral student in parasitology at Macdonald College in Sainte-Anne-de-Bellevue, Quebec. He shared a house with four roommates: Davis, Butler, Fisk, and Fern. The roommates were at odds with Kranz, who had not paid rent totalling CA$16.66 (1970) (equivalent to CA$134.76 or US$96.39 in 2025), and asked him to move out. Kranz became agitated and allegedly told the roommates, "I'll put parasites in your food and you'll wake up dead". Kranz did pay the full rent balance on January 31, but the roommates evicted him anyway. Some time around February 1, Kranz prepared a festive Winter Carnival dinner for his roommates, and allegedly tainted the food with eggs stolen from the university laboratory where he studied. The roommates were hospitalized around February 12, and Kranz left Quebec a couple of days later. As the medical investigation continued, doctors suspected poisoning and authorities were notified. On February 25 Kranz was charged with attempted murder and a warrant was sought for his arrest. He returned voluntarily to Quebec, surrendered to authorities on 9 March, pleaded not guilty, and was remanded on bail.

== Trial and acquittal ==
Kranz went on trial in June, 1971, charged with intentionally endangering the lives of his four roommates. There was expert evidence before the court consistent with the presence of Ascaris larvae in the bodies of two of the complainants: however, opinions from three other laboratory sources were not available. The defence further claimed that the infection could have occurred by way of a recurring sewage backup into the kitchen sink of the house: a version of events which was denied by at least one of the complainants. Kranz also pointed out in the course of his testimony that his roommates could have come into contact with Ascaris eggs simply by handling his clothing. Following consideration of the evidence, Judge Gerard Laganiere held that there was insufficient evidence to demonstrate the defendant's guilt beyond a reasonable doubt, and Kranz was acquitted.

== Medical aspects ==
About a week after the dinner, the roommates began to develop cough, dyspnea, weight loss, and fever. The symptoms did not improve, and on February 12 they sought treatment at Queen Elizabeth Hospital's emergency room with symptoms of acute respiratory distress. In addition to these symptoms physicians noted wheezing and the appearance of hives. The roommates were treated for pneumonia, but the infection did not respond to antibiotics. Davis and Butler were in critical condition. After about four days, the staff was able to confirm the ascariasis diagnosis upon isolating live larvae, about 4 mm long, in the sputum and gastric washings. This confirmed exposure to ascariasis ova which were in the microscopic larval stage, migrating via the blood from intestine to lung. As these larvae ascended the trachea and were swallowed again they began developing into mature worms. Four weeks after infection, the victims passed numerous immature worms in bowel movements. Physicians cleared the developing adults with a course of piperazine, effectively ending the infestation. The victims were released from the hospital March 5, but the attending physician said that one of the men would probably have permanent lung damage.

This infection established a baseline case or index case for Ascaris suum infection in humans. Doctors had originally consulted Walter Reed Army Medical Center but found no precedent for human infection.
