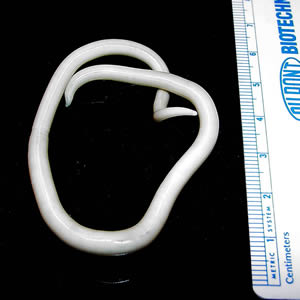
- Adult female
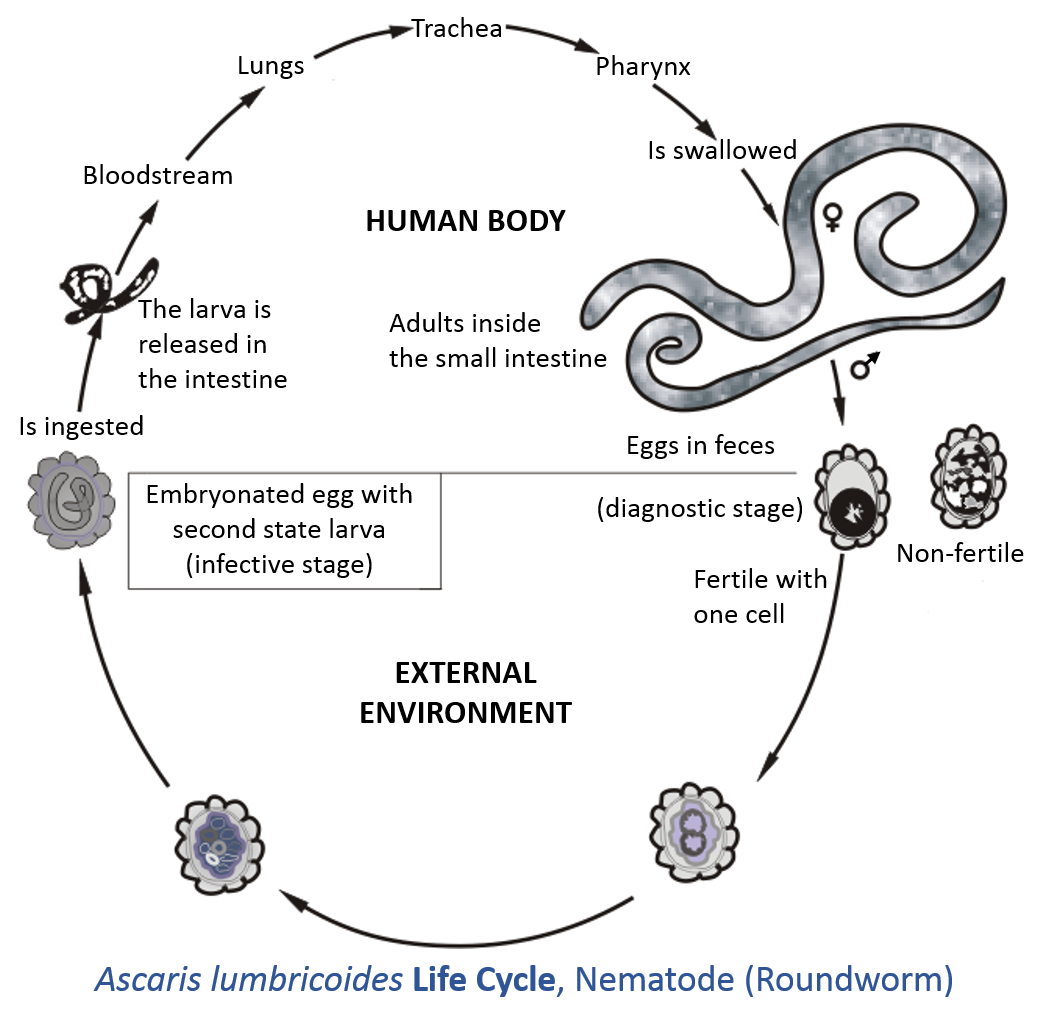
- Life cycle inside and outside of the human body of one fairly well described helminth: Ascaris lumbricoides

Scientific classification
- Kingdom: Animalia
- Phylum: Nematoda
- Class: Chromadorea
- Order: Rhabditida
- Family: Ascarididae
- Genus: Ascaris; Linnaeus, 1758

Species
- Ascaris lumbricoides Linn., 1758; Ascaris suum (Goeze, 1782)

= Ascaris =

Genus of roundworms

Ascaris is a nematode genus of parasitic worms known as the "small intestinal roundworms". One species, Ascaris lumbricoides, affects humans and causes the disease ascariasis. Another species, Ascaris suum, typically infects pigs. Other ascarid genera infect other animals, such as Parascaris equorum, the equine roundworm, and Toxocara and Toxascaris, which infect dogs and cats.

Their eggs are deposited in feces and soil. Plants with the eggs on them infect any organism that consumes them. A. lumbricoides is the largest intestinal roundworm and is the most common helminth infection of humans worldwide. Infestation can cause morbidity by compromising nutritional status, affecting cognitive processes, inducing tissue reactions such as granuloma to larval stages, and by causing intestinal obstruction, which can be fatal.

== Morphology and anatomy ==
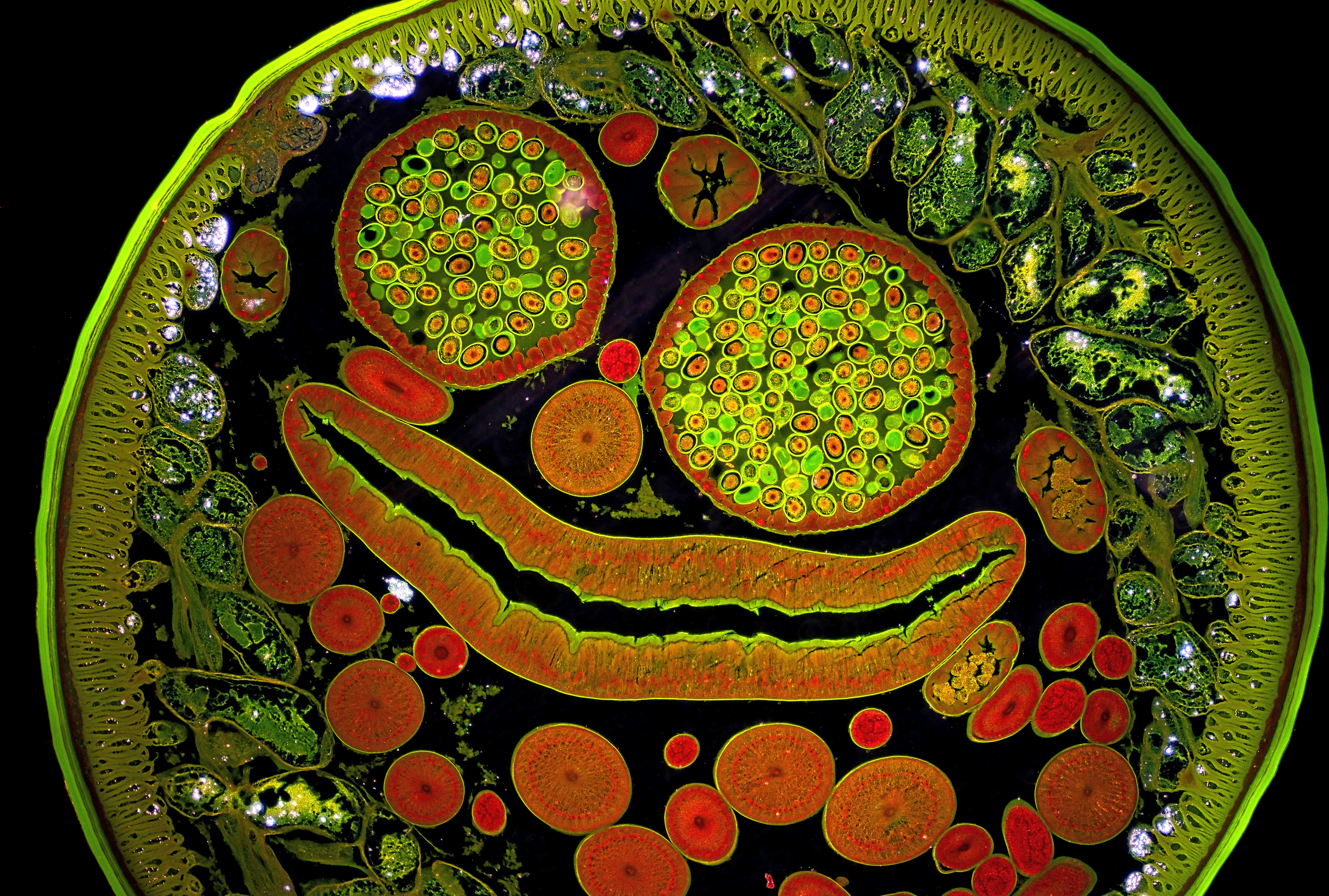
Ascaris cross section

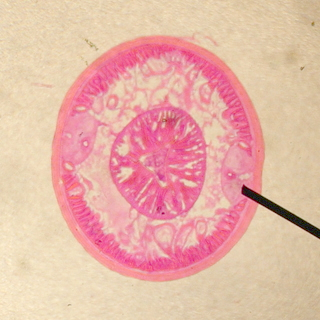
Esophagus of an Ascaris worm

- Adult: cylindrical shape, creamy white or pinkish in color
- Male: average 15–30 centimetres (5.9–11.8 in); more slender than the female
- Female: average 20–35 centimetres (7.9–13.8 in)

The body is long, cylindrical, and fusiform (pointed at both the ends). The body wall is composed of cuticle, epidermis and musculature. There is a pseudocoelom. The digestive tract is complete with prominent muscular pharynx. Respiration is by simple diffusion across body wall. The nervous system consists of a nerve ring and many longitudinal nerve cord. The animals are dioecious and have distinct reproductive systems, which comprise threadlike gonads and genital canals that have openings externally. Fertilization is internal and development is mostly indirect. Sexual dimorphism is well marked. Externally, males are much shorter than females and males also have a curved posterior end, unlike females. Internally, in males, all the digestive, reproductive systems open in a common chamber- cloaca whereas in females, there is a separate anus for digestive tract and female genital pore for female reproductive system.

== Defense mechanism ==
As part of the parasite defense strategy, Ascaris roundworms secrete a series of inhibitors to target digestive and immune-related host proteases, which include pepsin, trypsin, chymotrypsin/elastase, cathepsins, and metallocarboxypeptidases (MCPs). Ascaris species inhibit MCPs by releasing an enzyme known as Ascaris carboxypeptidase inhibitor (ACI). This enzyme binds to the active site of MCP and blocks the cleavage of its own proteins by the host MCP. Similarly, they inhibit trypsin by releasing the protein Ascaris Trypsin Inhibitor (pdb 1ATA).

== History ==
Ascaris has been present in humans for at least several thousand years, as evidenced by Ascaris eggs found in paleofeces and in the intestines of mummified humans.

A. lumbricoides was originally called Lumbricus teres and was first described in detail by Edward Tyson in 1683. The genus Ascaris was originally described as the genus for Ascaris lumbricoides by Carl Linnaeus in 1758. The morphologically similar Ascaris suum was described from pigs by Johann August Ephraim Goeze in 1782.

== See also ==
- List of parasites of humans
