= Wilder's law of initial value =

Wilder's law of initial value (German "Ausgangswertgesetz", Ausgangswert meaning baseline in modern terms) states that "the direction of response of a body function to any agent depends to a large degree on the initial level of that function", proposed by Joseph Wilder. It is unclear whether it is a real effect or a statistical artifact.

"Das Ausgangswertgesetz" was first published in 1931 by Springer. Wilder gave human subjects injections of pilocarpine, atropine, or adrenaline, and found that the changes in pulse and blood pressure were smaller than average, if subjects had high values before the injection, and vice versa.

Wilder's first informal articles and work on the topic began in 1922. At that time, he worked in the office of Dr. Wagner-Jauregg, the Nobel Prize–winning doctor, at the University of Vienna. Yet, because Wilder was Jewish, he did not have similar opportunities for full professorship as his career matured. His career was temporarily interrupted by emigration to the United States in 1938. Wilder's legacy was established through the Law of Initial Value, which has been published the world over. However, Wilder's research and writing ranged from diverse treatises on ethics and magical thinking, to research on criminology, multiple sclerosis, blood sugar, and many other topics. He also practiced psychoanalysis in New York, and previously, as the Director of the Rothschilds' hospital for neurotics called "Rosenhügel" in Vienna.
