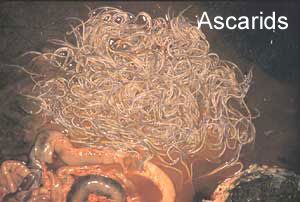
- Male (top) and female (bottom) P. equorum

Scientific classification
- Domain: Eukaryota
- Kingdom: Animalia
- Phylum: Nematoda
- Class: Chromadorea
- Order: Ascaridida
- Family: Ascarididae
- Genus: Parascaris; Yorke & Maplestone, 1926

Species
- Parascaris equorum; Parascaris univalens

= Parascaris =

Genus of roundworms

Parascaris is a genus of nematodes in the family Ascarididae. It contains two species, Parascaris equorum and Parascaris univalens, which are morphologically identical, but can be distinguished by chromosome number. Both species parasitize horses.
