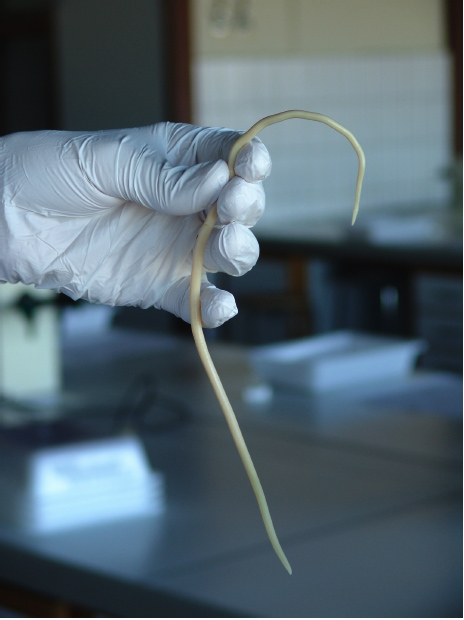

Scientific classification
- Kingdom: Animalia
- Phylum: Nematoda
- Class: Chromadorea
- Order: Ascaridida
- Family: Ascarididae
- Genus: Ascaris
- Species: A. suum

Binomial name
- Ascaris suum Goeze, 1782

= Ascaris suum =

Species of roundworm

Ascaris suum, also known as the large roundworm of pig, is a parasitic nematode that causes ascariasis in pigs. While roundworms in pigs and humans are today considered as two species (A. suum and A. lumbricoides) with different hosts, cross-infection between humans and pigs is possible; some researchers have thus argued they are the same species. Ascariasis is associated with contact to pigs and pig manure in Denmark.

A. suum is distributed worldwide and grows up to 40 cm (16 in) in length. Ascaris infections are treated with ascaricides. A. suum is in the family Ascarididae, and is one of the oldest associations to mankind.

== Life cycle ==
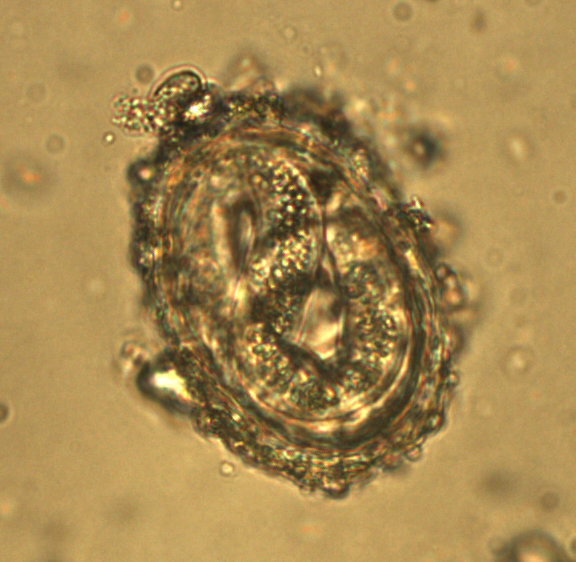
Embryonated A. suum egg containing a visible, infective L3 stage larva.

Pigs get infected with A. suum by ingesting infectious parasite eggs that are present in the environment. The larvae of Ascaris complete two moults within the egg; therefore, the larvae emerging from the egg is not a second-stage larva (L2) as was previously presumed, but rather a third stage larva (L3) covered by a loosened L2 cuticle. The larvae hatch from the egg inside the pig's intestines and subsequently start their migration through the body. First, they penetrate the intestinal wall at caecum/colon and use the mesenterial blood veins to migrate to the liver. After burrowing their way through the liver tissue, they again use the efferent blood stream to carry them to the lungs. There, they get stuck in the capillaries surrounding the lungs and they penetrate the lung alveoli. It takes approximately 7 days to reach the lungs. Once the larvae are inside the lung, they migrate up the respiratory tree and are eventually coughed up and swallowed by the host to reach the small intestine again as soon as 10 days after infection. There, the larvae undergo their first molt inside the host to reach the L4 stage by day 14 post-infection. Around day 25 post infection, they develop into the L5 stage. Worms reach adulthood 6 weeks after infection, and when both female and male worms are present in the same host, fertilized eggs are produced and secreted by the female worm. These eggs are then excreted together with the faeces. After an incubation period, infective stage larvae develop in the eggs and are ready to cause infection in a new host.

Paratenic hosts ingest the eggs and the L3 larvae remain in the tissues of the paratenic host until a pig eats them. These may include beetles and earthworms, as well as large to jumbo chicken eggs from at-risk fowl.

== Epidemiology ==
Ascaris eggs can remain infective for years in the soil, even in a temperate climate. The migration of A. suum larvae through the lungs may cause secondary bacterial infections and result in acute respiratory symptoms in pigs.

== Morphology ==
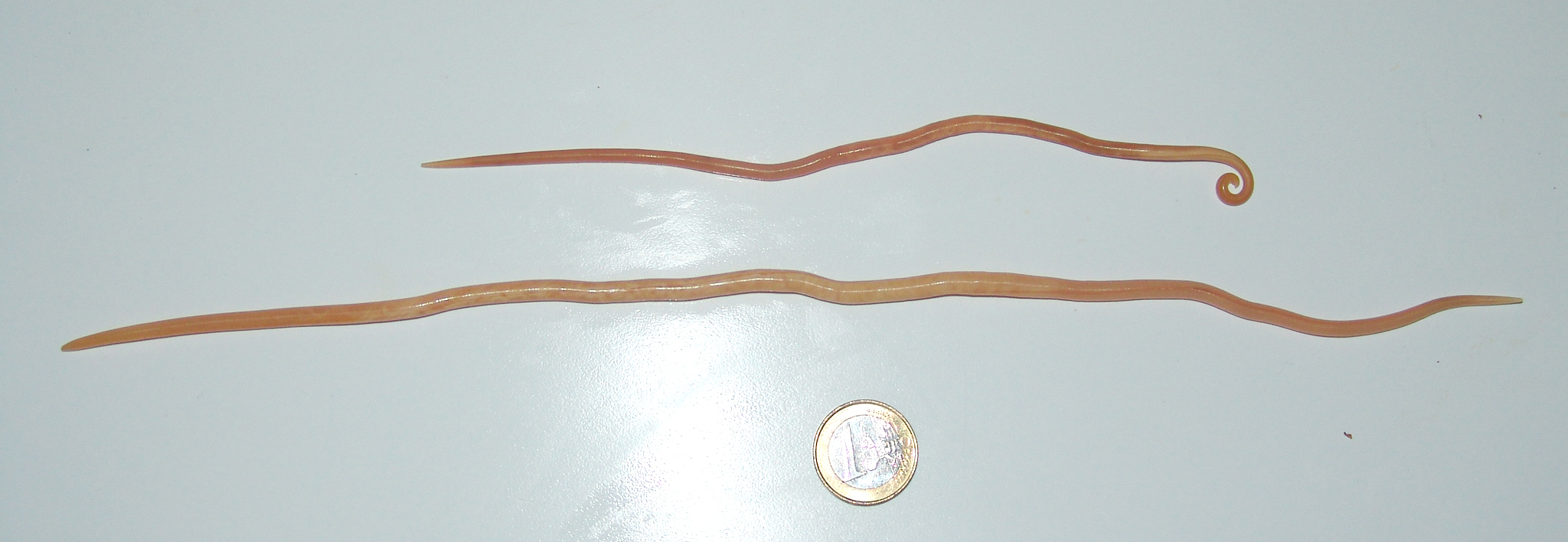
A. suum adult male with typical curled posterior end together with a significantly larger female worm.

Males are about 15–31 cm (6–12 in) long, and 2–4 mm (0.1–0.2 in) wide. The posterior end is curved toward the ventral side with a pointed tail. They have simple spicules that measure 2.0–3.5 mm (0.08–0.14 in) long. Females are larger than males, measuring 20–49 cm (8–19 in) long and 3–6 mm (0.12–0.24 in) in diameter. From the anterior end, the vulva occupies about one-third of the body length. In addition to their large size, these species also have the three prominent lips. Each lip contains a dentigerous ridge, and no interlabia or alae. Females can lay up to 200,000 eggs per day, and their uteri can contain up to 27 million eggs at a time. Fertilized eggs are ovoid, ranging from 45 to 75 μm length and 35 to 50 μm in diameter. The uterine wall contributes to the lumpy and thick outer layer of the egg. The mammillated layer is stained golden-brown by the host's bile when the eggs are passed in faeces. Females can also deposit unfertilized eggs that are narrower and longer than normal fertilized eggs, ranging from 88 to 94 μm in length, and 44 μm diameter. Only the proteinaceous layer can be seen in unfertilized eggs, because after fertilization, the vitelline, chitinous, and lipid layers form.

== Incidents and outbreaks ==
In Canada in 1970, a postgraduate student tainted his roommates' food with A. suum. Four of the victims became seriously ill; two of these suffered acute respiratory failure.

== Genetics ==
A 273-megabase draft genome for A. suum was published in 2011.
