= Hexametra =

Scientific classification
- Domain: Eukaryota
- Kingdom: Animalia
- Phylum: Nematoda
- Class: Chromadorea
- Order: Ascaridida
- Family: Ascarididae
- Genus: Hexametra; Travassos, 1919

Genus of worms

Hexametra is a genus of nematodes belonging to the family Ascarididae.

The genus has almost cosmopolitan distribution.

Species:

- Hexametra boddaertii Baird, 1860
- Hexametra bozkovi Moravec, 1966
- Hexametra quadricornis (Wedl, 1861)
