= Porrocaecum =

Scientific classification
- Kingdom: Animalia
- Phylum: Nematoda
- Class: Chromadorea
- Order: Rhabditida
- Family: Ascarididae
- Genus: Porrocaecum; Railliet & Henry, 1912

Type species
- Ascaris crassa Deslongchamps, 1824

Species
- See text

Genus of roundworms

Porrocaecum is a genus of nematodes belonging to the family Ascarididae.

The genus has cosmopolitan distribution.

== Species ==
Porrocaecum contains the following species:

- Porrocaecum angusticolle Molin, 1860
- Porrocaecum circinum Johnston & Mawson, 1941
- Porrocaecum crassum Deslongchamps, 1824 (type)
- Porrocaecum depressum Zeder, 1800
- Porrocaecum ensicaudatum Zeder, 1800
- Porrocaecum falklandicum Baylis, 1929
- Porrocaecum heteropterum Diesing, 1851
- Porrocaecum moraveci Gu et al., 2023
- Porrocaecum parvum Li, Guo & Zhang, 2015
- Porrocaecum reticulatum Linstow, 1899
- Porrocaecum serpentulus Rudolphi, 1809
- Porrocaecum streperae Johnston & Mawson, 1941
- Porrocaecum talpae Schrank, 1788
