= Burkinabin C =

- Chemical structure of burkinabin C

Names
- Preferred IUPAC name (1S,3R,4R,5R)-1,3-Dihydroxy-4,5-bis[(4-hydroxy-3-methoxybenzoyl)oxy]cyclohexane-1-carboxylic acid
- Other names 4,5-O-divanilloylquinic acid

Identifiers
CAS Number	720682-39-3
3D model (JSmol)	Interactive image
ChemSpider	10363137
PubChem CID	23250814
UNII	HZ5FJG5GK4
CompTox Dashboard (EPA)	DTXSID501029618
- InChI: InChI=1S/C23H24O12/c1-32-16-7-11(3-5-13(16)24)20(27)34-18-10-23(31,22(29)30)9-15(26)19(18)35-21(28)12-4-6-14(25)17(8-12)33-2/h3-8,15,18-19,24-26,31H,9-10H2,1-2H3,(H,29,30)/t15-,18-,19-,23+/m1/s1 Key: NNIPMYIDMKBMBF-ALIIGJLFSA-N; InChI=1/C23H24O12/c1-32-16-7-11(3-5-13(16)24)20(27)34-18-10-23(31,22(29)30)9-15(26)19(18)35-21(28)12-4-6-14(25)17(8-12)33-2/h3-8,15,18-19,24-26,31H,9-10H2,1-2H3,(H,29,30)/t15-,18-,19-,23+/m1/s1 Key: NNIPMYIDMKBMBF-ALIIGJLFBH
- SMILES: O=C(O[C@@H]2[C@H](O)C[C@](O)(C[C@H]2OC(=O)c1ccc(O)c(OC)c1)C(O)=O)c3ccc(O)c(OC)c3

Properties
Chemical formula	C_{23}H_{24}O_{12}
Molar mass	492.433 g·mol^{−1}
- Except where otherwise noted, data are given for materials in their standard state (at 25 °C [77 °F], 100 kPa). verify (what is ?) Infobox references

Burkinabin C is a divanilloylquinic acid found in the root bark of Fagara zanthoxyloides (Zanthoxylum zanthoxyloides).
