= Fagaronine =

Names
- Preferred IUPAC name 2-Hydroxy-3,8,9-trimethoxy-5-methylbenzo[c]phenanthridin-5-ium

Identifiers
CAS Number	52259-65-1
3D model (JSmol)	Interactive image
ChEBI	CHEBI:28954
ChEMBL	ChEMBL121087
ChemSpider	36825
KEGG	C09438
PubChem CID	40305
UNII	59HNE8RJS6
CompTox Dashboard (EPA)	DTXSID30200298
- InChI: InChI=1S/C21H19NO4/c1-22-11-13-8-19(25-3)20(26-4)9-15(13)14-6-5-12-7-17(23)18(24-2)10-16(12)21(14)22/h5-11H,1-4H3/p+1 Key: OOKZVPUCASIEBL-UHFFFAOYSA-O
- SMILES: C[n+]2cc4cc(OC)c(cc4c1ccc3cc(O)c(OC)cc3c12)OC

Properties
Chemical formula	C_{21}H_{20}NO_{4}^{+}
Molar mass	350.393 g·mol^{−1}
- Except where otherwise noted, data are given for materials in their standard state (at 25 °C [77 °F], 100 kPa). Infobox references

Fagaronine is a benzophenanthridine alkaloid found in Zanthoxylum zanthoxyloides and other species in the genus Zanthoxylum.
