= William Henry Ransom =

English physician

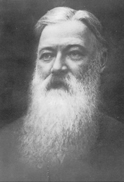
- Born: 19 November 1824; Cromer, Norfolk
- Died: 16 April 1907 (aged 82); Nottingham
- Occupation: Physician

William Henry Ransom FRS (19 November 1824 – 16 April 1907) was an English physician and embryologist.

== Biography ==
Ransom was born at Cromer, Norfolk, on 19 November 1824. He was the elder son of Henry Ransom, a master mariner of that town, who died in 1832. His mother, Mary Jones, was daughter of a Welsh clergyman. Educated at a private school at Norwich, Ransom was apprenticed at sixteen to a medical practitioner at King's Lynn. In 1843 he proceeded to University College, London, where Huxley was a fellow student. Writing to Herbert Spencer on 1 June 1886, Huxley points out that at the examination in 1845 Ransom came out first, winning an exhibition, and he second, with momentous results to himself. 'If Ransom,' Huxley continues, 'had worked less hard I might have been first and he second, in which case I should have obtained the exhibition, should not have gone into the navy, and should have forsaken science for practice' (Life and Letters of T. H. Huxley, 1900, ii. 133). After holding residential posts at University College Hospital, Ransom studied in Paris and Germany, graduating M.D. London in 1850. Then settling at Nottingham, he was from 1854 to 1890 physician to the Nottingham General Hospital. He became F.R.C.P. London in 1869, and fellow, respectively, of the Royal Medical and Chirurgical Society and University College, London, in 1854 and 1896. He was elected F.R.S. on 2 June 1870 for his knowledge of physiology and original observations in ovology, his candidature being supported among others by Huxley, Paget, and Lister.

Ransom's chief contributions to pure science were made when he was comparatively young, his later activities being absorbed in professional work. He was author of nine papers of value on embryological subjects, of which the first, 'On the Impregnation of the Ovum in the Stickleback,' appeared in the 'Proceedings of the Royal Society' (vol. vii. 1854–5). Another, ’On the Ovum of Osseous Fishes,' was published in the 'Philosophical Transactions' for 1867. He was interested in geology and assisted in the exploration of Nottinghamshire and Derbyshire caves, reading at the first meeting of the British Association at Nottingham, in 1866, a paper 'On the Occurrence of Felis Lynx as a British Fossil.' In 1892, when the British Medical Association met there. Ransom was president of the section of medicine, his address dealing with various aspects of vegetable pathology.

In 1870 Ransom devised a disinfecting stove (gas-heated) for the sterilisation of infected clothing, which was used extensively till steam methods were adopted. A presidential address to the Nottingham Medico-Chirurgical Society, 'On Colds as a Cause of Disease,' delivered on 4 November 1887, attracted attention. His only independent publication, 'The Inflammation Idea in General Pathology,' appeared in 1906 (Nature, 29 November 1906; Brit. Med. Journ. 23 June 1906).

Through his long career at Nottingham Ransom identified himself with the welfare of the place. Zealous in support of the volunteer movement, he served for fifteen years in the 1st Notts rifle corps. Interested in educational questions, he helped in the establishment of University College, Nottingham, of the governing body of which he was a member. He died at his residence. Park Valley, Nottingham, on 16 April 1907.

In 1860 he married Elizabeth, daughter of Dr. John William Bramwell of North Shields, who predeceased him. They had issue four sons and one daughter. The eldest son. Dr. W. B. Ransom (b. 5 September 1860), succeeded his father as physician to the General Hospital, Nottingham, dying in 1909.
