= Diffuse unilateral subacute neuroretinitis =

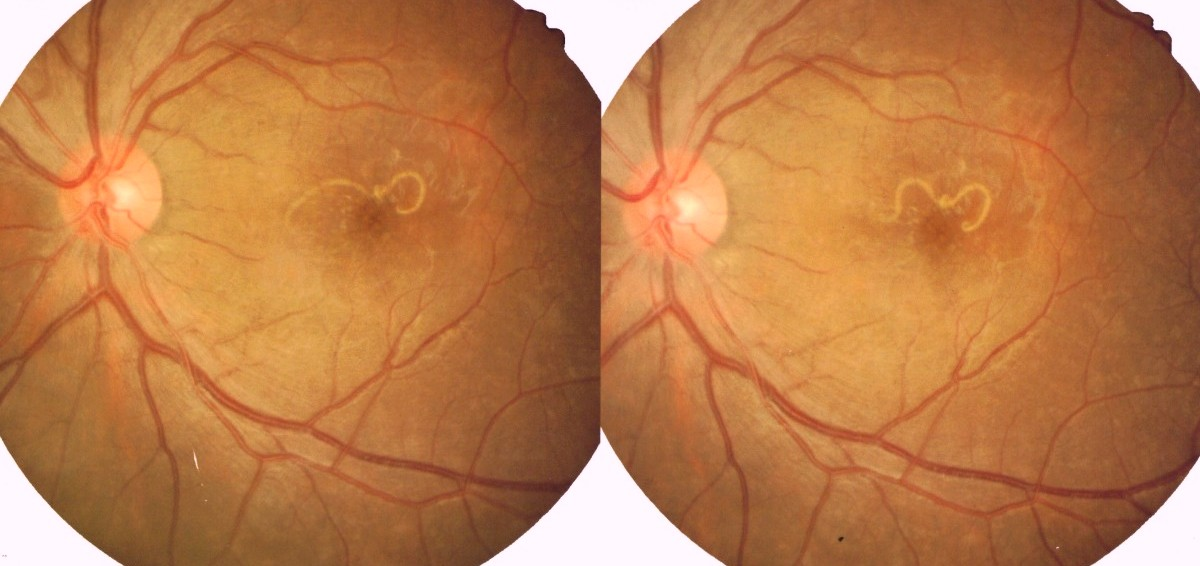
- Left eye retina photograph shows moving nematode larva at the macular area

Diffuse unilateral subacute neuroretinitis (DUSN) is a rare condition that occurs in otherwise healthy, often young patients and is due to the presence of a subretinal nematode.

== Signs and symptoms ==
The clinical findings in this disease can be divided into acute and end-stage manifestations:

In the acute phase, patients often present with decreased visual acuity, vitritis, papillitis, and crops of gray-white or yellow-white outer retinal lesions. The clustering of the retinal lesions is important because this often helps to localize the causative nematode.

If left untreated, patients ultimately develop late sequel, which may include optic atrophy, retinal arterial narrowing, diffuse retinal pigment epithelial changes, and an abnormal electroretinogram. The late findings of this condition are often misinterpreted as unilateral retinitis pigmentosa.

== Cause ==
DUSN may be caused by a helminthic infection with Toxocara canis, Baylisascaris procyonis, or Ancylostoma caninum. The characteristic lesions are believed to result from a single nematode migrating within the subretinal space. Although previously thought to be endemic in some areas, that belief was likely due to under awareness. DUSN has been diagnosed in patients in many countries and climates including America, Brazil, China and India.

== Treatment ==
If the nematode can be seen by an ophthalmologist, which occurs in less than half of cases, it should be treated with photocoagulation for extramacular location and surgical removal in case the larva is lying in the macula. After the worm is killed, visual acuity loss usually does not progress. Alternatively, Antihelminthic treatment such as high dose oral Albendazole and prednisolone may be used.
