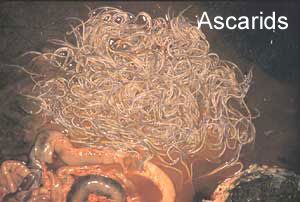
- Male (top) and female (bottom) P. equorum

Scientific classification
- Domain: Eukaryota
- Kingdom: Animalia
- Phylum: Nematoda
- Class: Chromadorea
- Order: Ascaridida
- Family: Ascarididae
- Genus: Parascaris
- Species: P. equorum

Binomial name
- Parascaris equorum (Goeze, 1782)

Synonyms
- Ascaris equorum Goeze, 1782; Ascaris megalocephala Cloquet, 1824

= Parascaris equorum =

Species of roundworm

Parascaris equorum is a species of ascarid that is the equine roundworm. Amongst horse owners, the parasites are colloquially called "Ascarids". This is a host-specific helminth intestinal parasite that can infect horses, donkeys, and zebras. Horses up to six months of age are the most susceptible to infection. After this time, infection rates begin to decline and is extremely uncommon in horses over twelve months of age. It cannot infect humans or other animals. It is yellow-white in color, and females can become as large as 15 inches (38 cm) in length. Found worldwide, P. equorum is one of the most difficult equine parasites to kill, requiring larger doses of more powerful anthelmintic medications than are needed for other equine parasites.

== Life cycle ==
P. equorum is sexually dimorphic, the females are significantly larger than males. While males only grow up to 15–28 cm in length, the females can grow up to 50 cm in length. They are a white-colored, cylindrical worm and have three large lips. Mating occurs in the small intestine of the equid. The female is able to lay over 170,000 eggs in a day, and 60,000,000 eggs in a year. Eggs have a thick, multilayered shell for protection and the ability to adhere to any surface they touch once expelled. Eggs are expelled in feces, which are then consumed by a horse while eating contaminated grass or drinking contaminated water. In a three-month life cycle, the swallowed eggs become larva and migrate from the small intestines into blood vessels and from there travel to the liver, where they molt into another larval stage. From there, they migrate to the lungs, where they emerge from blood vessels into the alveoli. They spend between 14 and 17 days migrating through the liver and lungs. At this point, they are coughed up and re-swallowed, where the larvae mature into adult roundworms that produce eggs. The worms take from 79 to 110 days to reach adulthood. P. equorum lives by sucking up the liquid contents of the intestine and may occasionally also suck blood from the intestinal wall.

== Clinical signs of infestation ==
Horses may develop a cough and a nasal discharge during the lung migration stage. Scarring of internal organs, particularly the lungs and liver, can occur during parasite migration. Severe infestations of adult P. equorum can also cause colic, intestinal blockage and potential intestinal rupture. Feed absorption is often reduced, and other clinical signs may include unthriftiness, potbelly, rough hair coat, and slow growth.

Severe infestations of P. equorum are able to create a mechanical blockage in the intestines. In some cases, deworming treatment may actually trigger an intestinal blockage of dead and dying parasites; for this reason, severe cases may require multiple treatments of milder drugs.

Diagnosis of infestation can be found by looking for eggs in feces via a microscopic examination. The limitation of this method is that only mature worms can be detected via their eggs; immature larval forms are difficult to detect, and blood tests are unreliable.

== Treatment ==
Mature horses appear to develop a certain degree of resistance to this parasite, but it is a concern for younger horses up to about two years old. P. equorum is one of the few parasites where a natural immunity develops in the host. However, when an infection is found in an adult horse, both the worm and egg counts are substantially low.

Deworming can begin with foals at four to eight weeks of age and is repeated about every 60 days. Treatment is with anthelmintic medication, and rotating between different classes of anthelmintics is recommended. Effective treatments include the macrocyclic lactones, notably ivermectin or moxidectin, which can kill the early larval stages before they migrate into the liver and lungs. Another class of effective medication are the benzimidazoles, such as fenbendazole. Pyrantel pamoate is also used, and a closely related variant, pyrantel tartrate, can be fed as a daily dose that is effective at killing larvae. Prior to development of these drugs, during the 1950s and 1960s, treatment with piperazine, dichlorvos and trichlorfon was used.

Keeping pastures and stables free of manure has been shown to be effective in reducing parasite infestations in horses. Rotation of pastures, particularly by putting animals of other species into the rotation, can also reduce the amount of parasite infestation.
