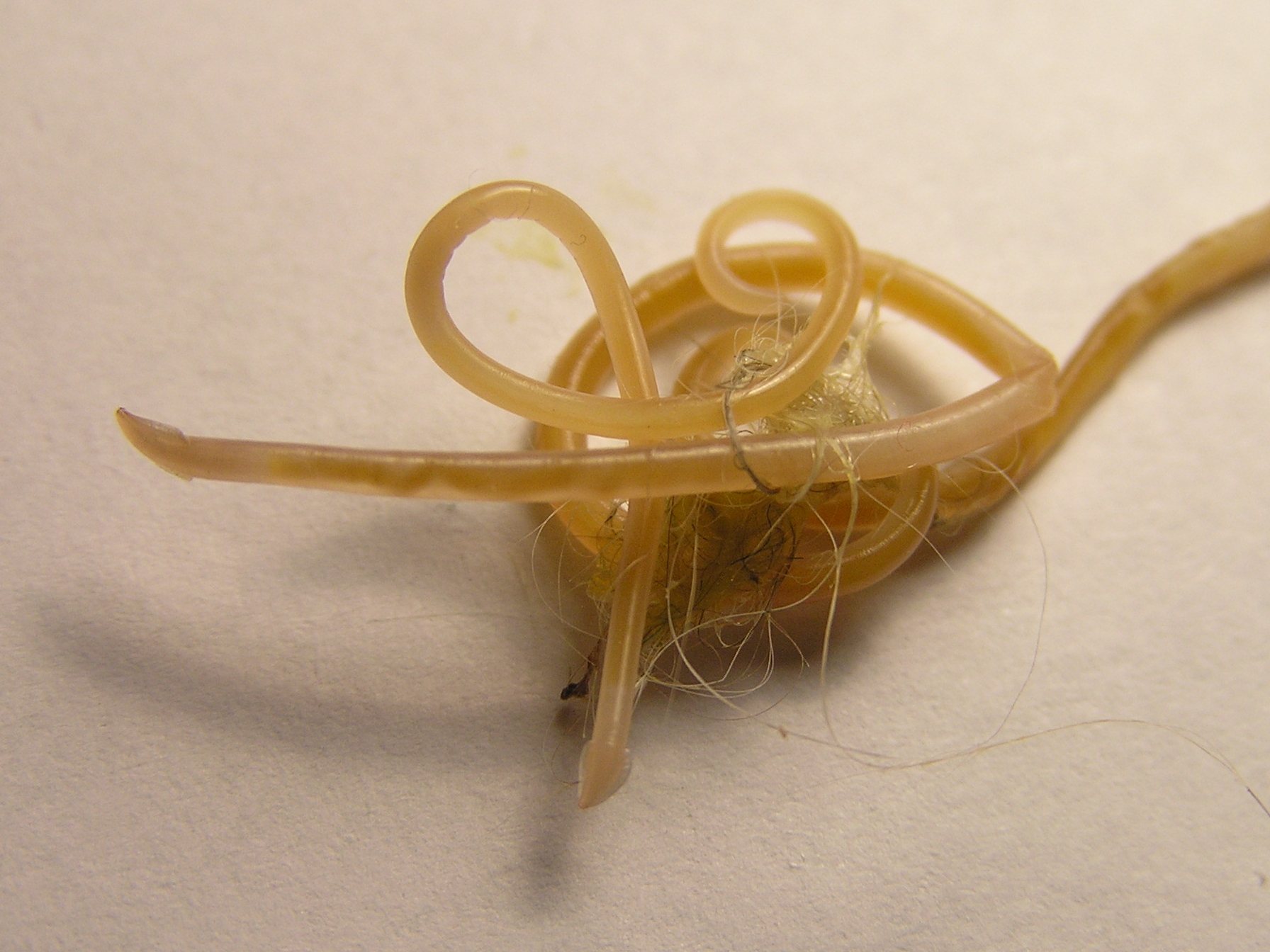
- Toxocara cati

Scientific classification
- Kingdom: Animalia
- Phylum: Nematoda
- Class: Chromadorea
- Order: Rhabditida
- Superfamily: Ascaridoidea
- Family: Ascarididae; Baird, 1853

= Ascarididae =

Family of roundworms

The Ascarididae are a family of the large intestinal roundworms. Members of the family are intestinal parasites, infecting all classes of vertebrates. It includes a number of genera, the most well known of which are:

- Amplicaecum
- Angusticaecum
- Ascaris
- †Ascarites (fossil)
- Baylisascaris
- Crossophorus
- Dujardinascaris
- Hexametra
- Lagochilascaris
- Ophidascaris
- Parascaris
- Polydelphis
- Porrocaecum
- Seuratascaris
- Toxascaris
- Toxocara
- Travassoascaris

Ascaris lumbricoides is the main ascarid parasite of humans, causing ascariasis.
