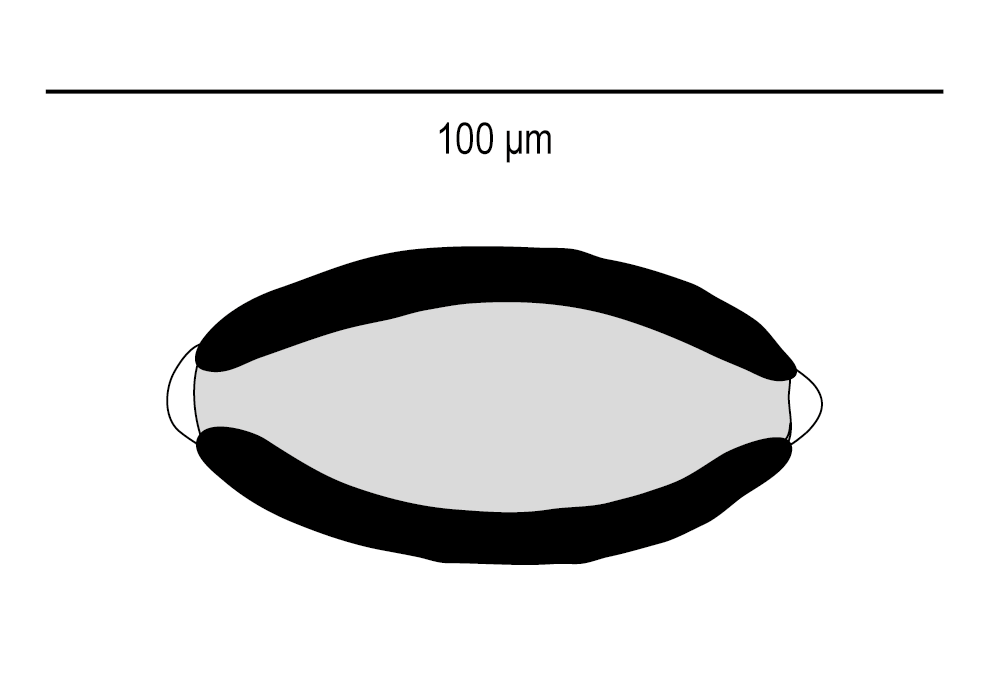
- Drawing of egg of Huffmanela hamo
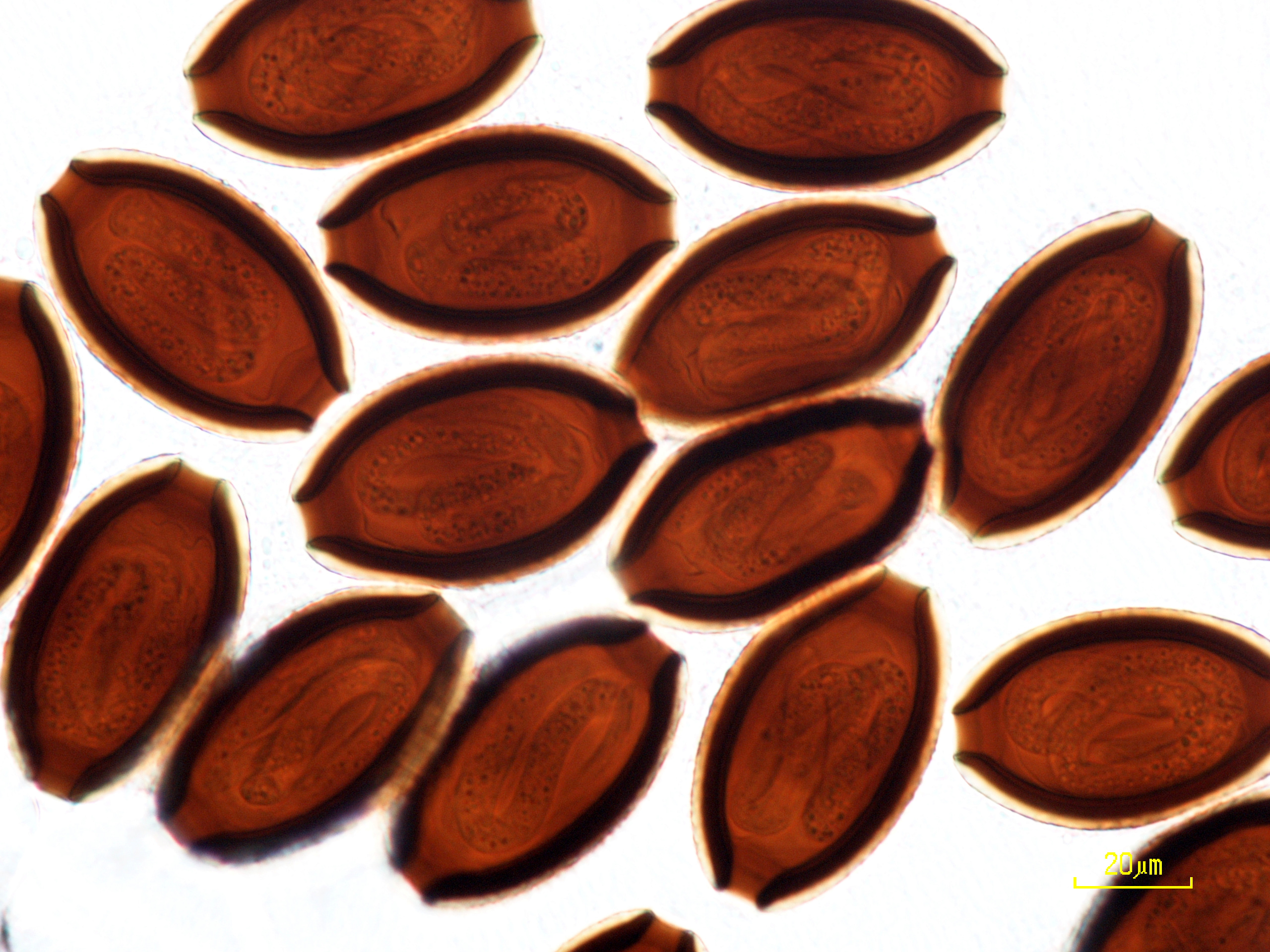
- Eggs observed with a microscope

Scientific classification
- Kingdom: Animalia
- Phylum: Nematoda
- Class: Enoplea
- Order: Trichocephalida
- Family: Trichosomoididae
- Genus: Huffmanela
- Species: H. hamo

Binomial name
- Huffmanela hamo Justine & Iwaki, 2014

= Huffmanela hamo =

Species of roundworm

Huffmanela hamo is a parasitic nematode. It has been observed in the muscles of the dagger-tooth pike conger Muraenesox cinereus, a muraenesocid marine fish off Japan. Its life-cycle is unknown.

== Description ==
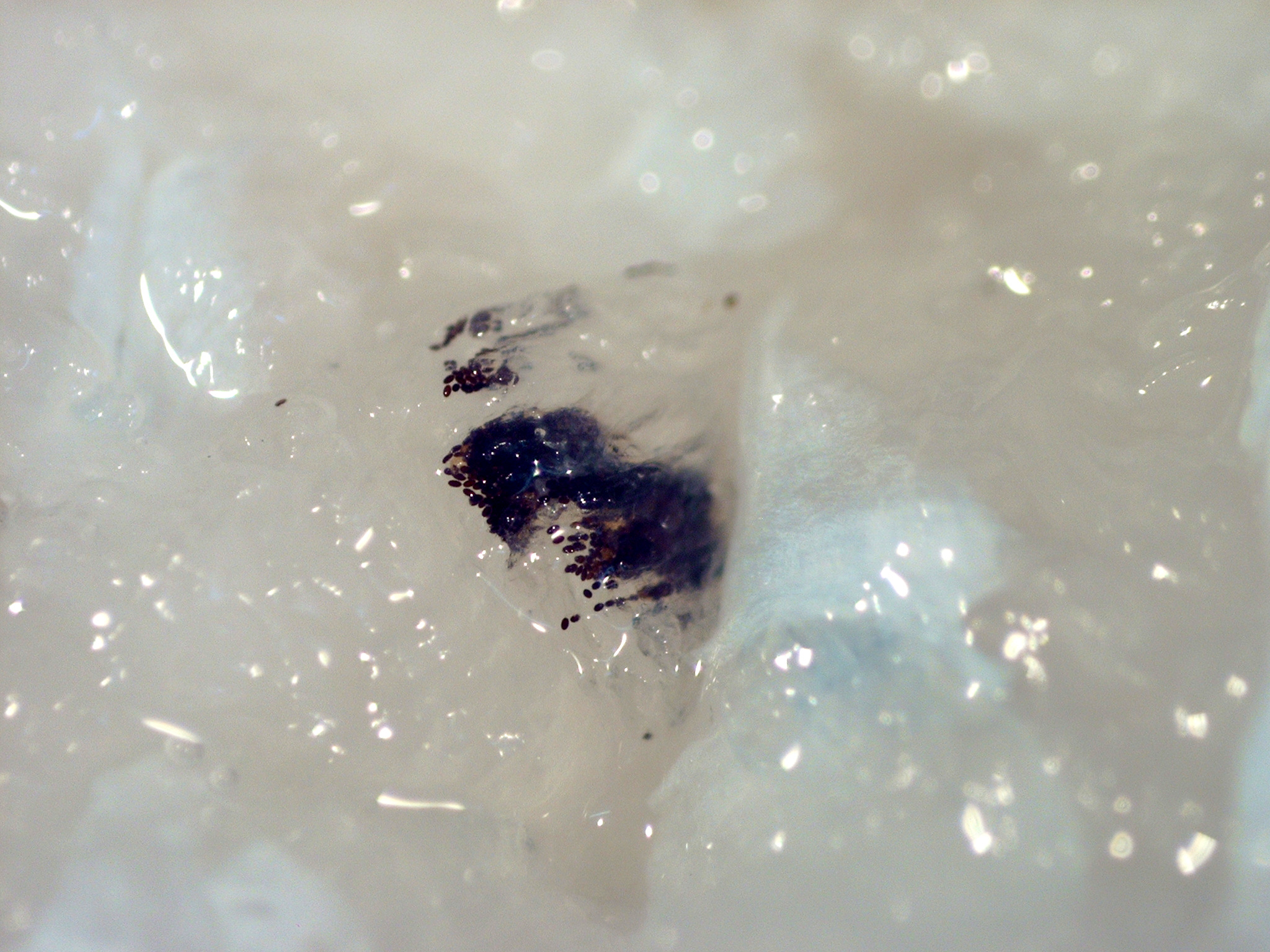
Black spot, made up of Huffmanela hamo eggs in muscles of Muraenesox cinereus

The adults are unknown, only the eggs were described. The parasite was detected by the presence of small black spots, 1–2 mm in diameter, in the flesh (muscles) of fish; these black spots are accumulations of eggs. The eggs are 66–77 μm (mean 72 μm) in length and 33–38 μm (mean 35 μm) in width. The surface of the eggs is smooth and bears neither envelope nor filaments. The nematode was differentiated from other members of the genus Huffmanela by the dimensions of its eggs and the characteristics of their surface. It is the single Huffmanela species which is parasitic in a fish of the family Muraenesocidae.
Since Huffmanela hamo is a parasite of the flesh and the fish is consumed by humans, it is useful to remind that species of the genus Huffmanela do not infest humans, and thus the consumption of infected fish is harmless.

== See also ==
- Huffmanela
- Huffmanela branchialis
- Huffmanela filamentosa
- Huffmanela lata
- Huffmanela ossicola
