= Fish gill =

Organ that allows fish to breathe underwater

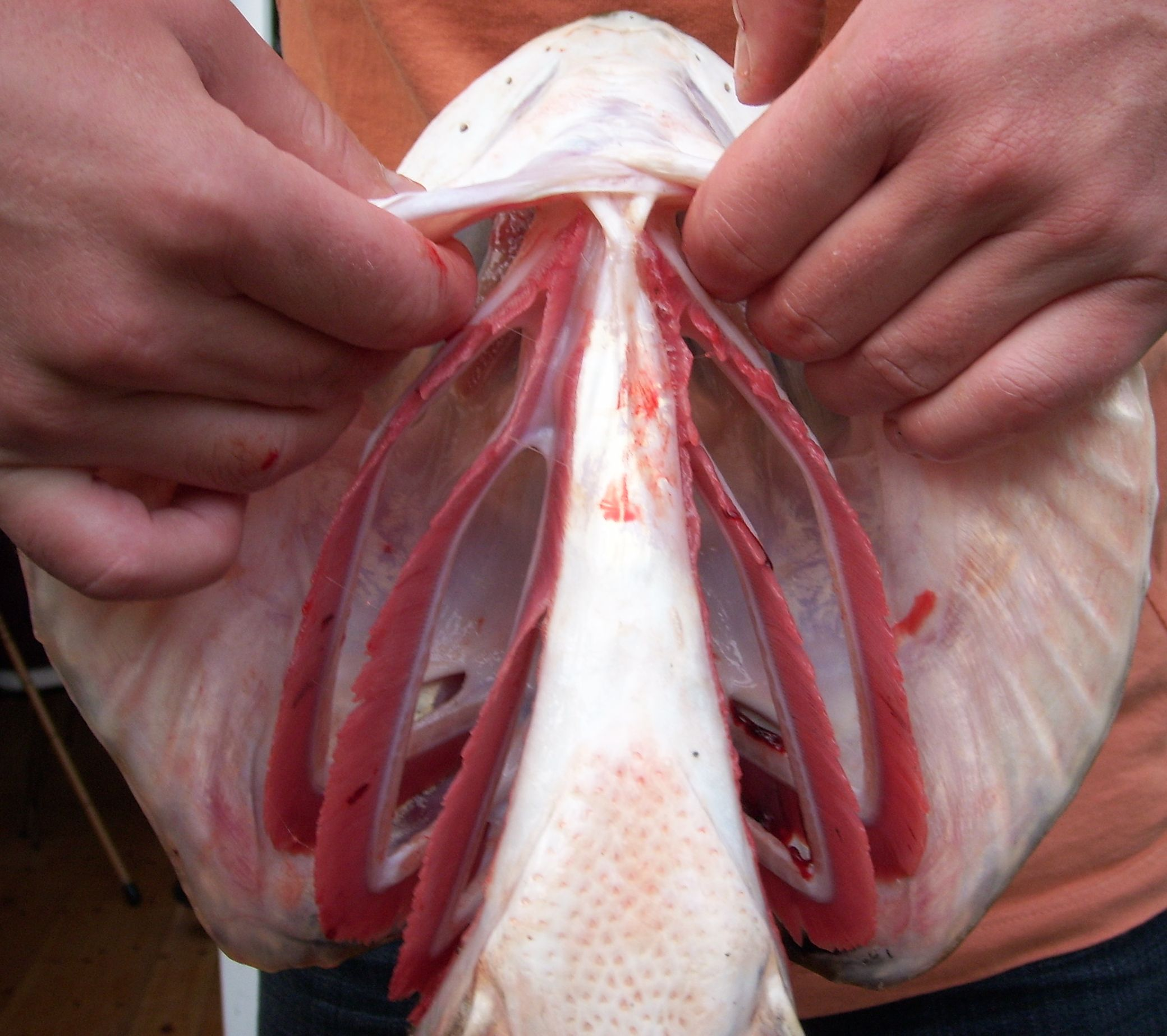
Gill arches bearing gills in a pike.
Gills allow fish to breathe underwater.

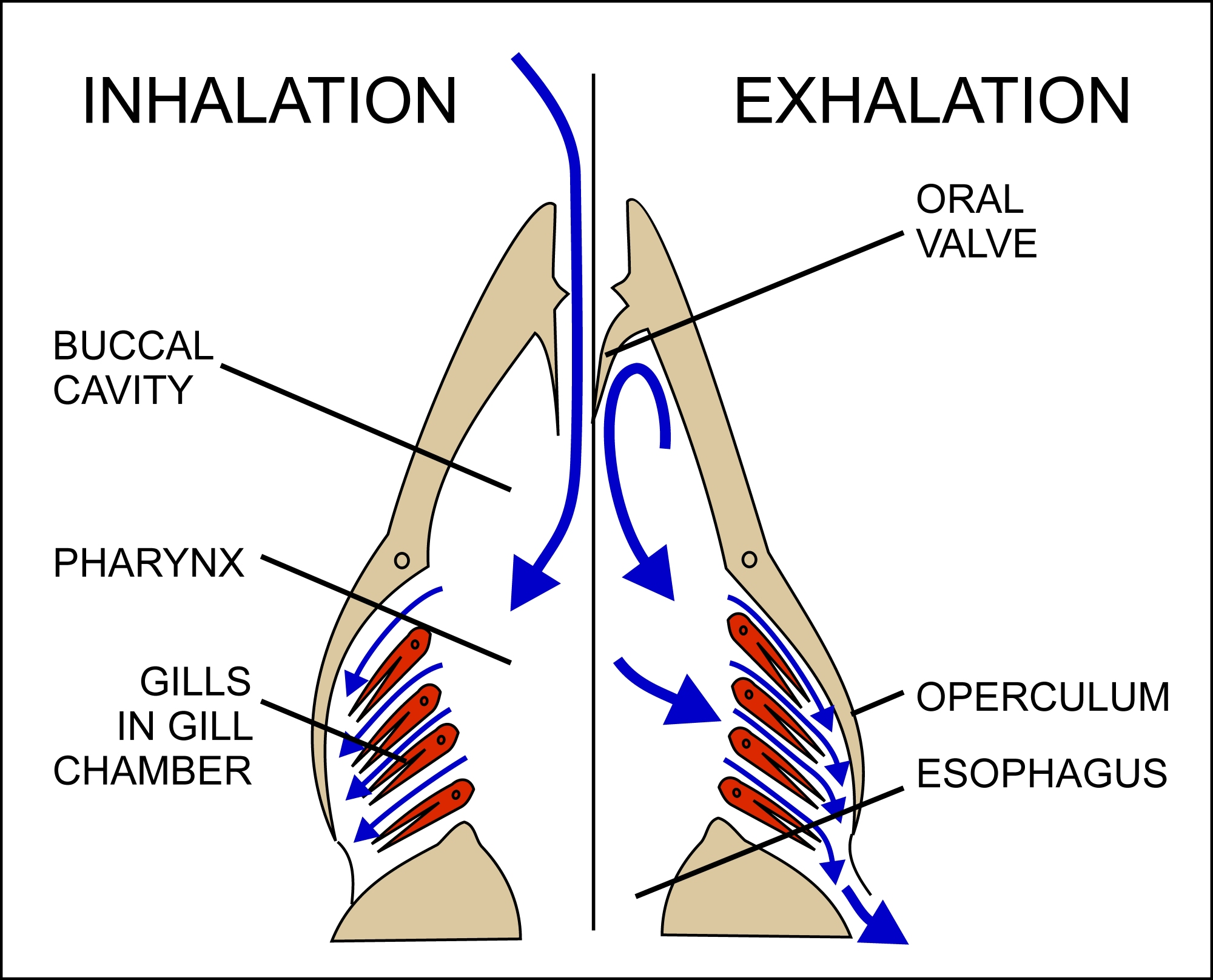
Respiratory mechanism in bony fish
The fish draws oxygen-rich water in through the mouth (left). It then pumps it over gills so oxygen enters the bloodstream, and allows oxygen-depleted water to exit through the gill slits (right)

Fish gills are organs that allow fish to breathe underwater. Most fish exchange gases like oxygen and carbon dioxide using gills on both sides of the pharynx (throat). Gills possess tissues resembling short threads, referred to as gill filaments or lamellae. Each filament contains a capillary network that provides a large surface area for exchanging oxygen and carbon dioxide. Other than respiration, these filaments have other functions including the exchange of ions, water, acids, and ammonia.

Fish respire by pulling oxygen-rich water through their mouths and pumping it over their gills. Within the gill filaments, capillary blood flows in the opposite direction to the water, causing countercurrent exchange. The gills push the oxygen-poor water out through openings in the sides of the pharynx. Some fish, like sharks and lampreys, possess multiple gill openings, but the most common group of fish alive, the bony fish, have a single gill opening on each side. This opening is hidden beneath a protective bony cover called the operculum.

Juvenile bichirs have external gills, a very primitive feature that they share with larval amphibians.

Previously, the evolution of gills was thought to have occurred through two diverging lines: gills formed from the endoderm, as seen in jawless fish species, or those form by the ectoderm, as seen in jawed fish. However, recent studies on gill formation of the little skate (Leucoraja erinacea) has shown potential evidence supporting the claim that gills from all current fish species have in fact evolved from a common ancestor.

== Breathing with gills ==
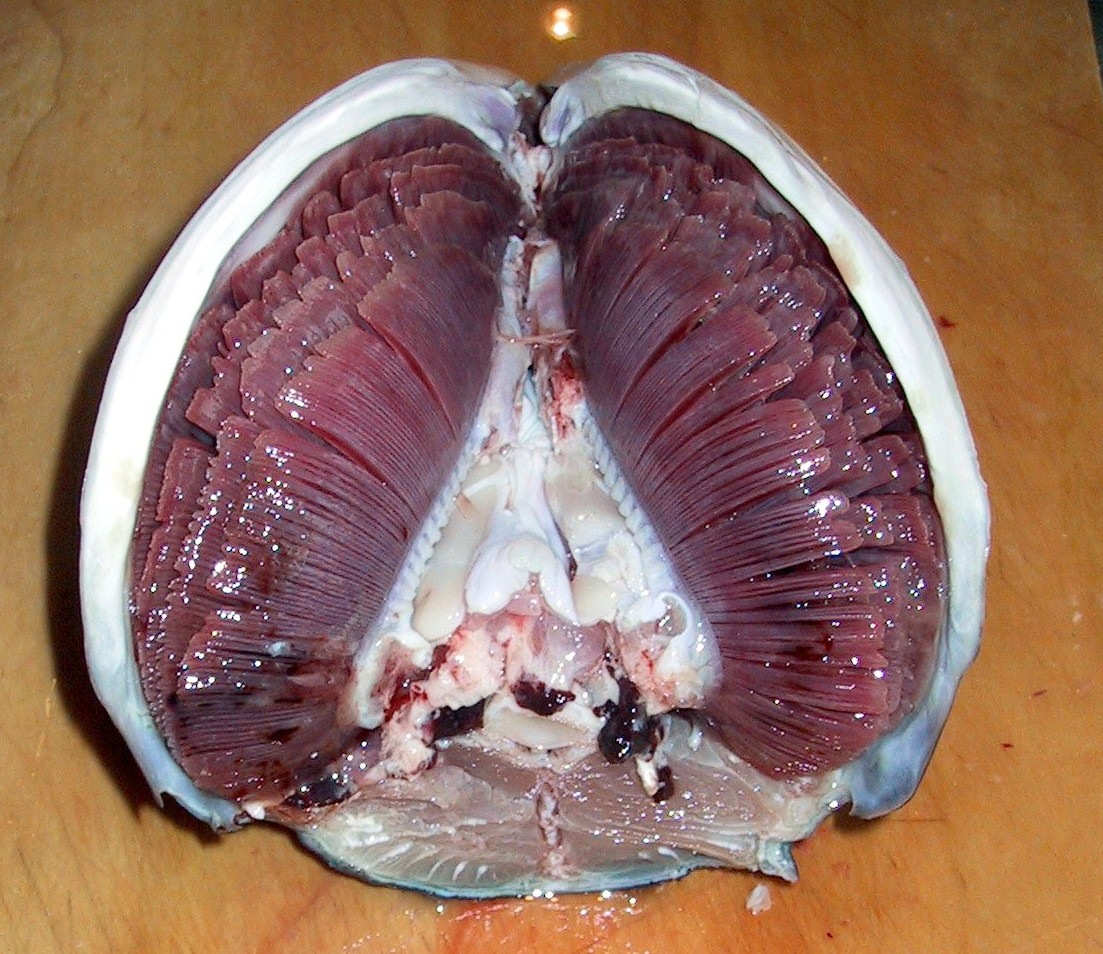
Tuna gills inside the head. The head is oriented snout-down with the view looking towards the mouth.

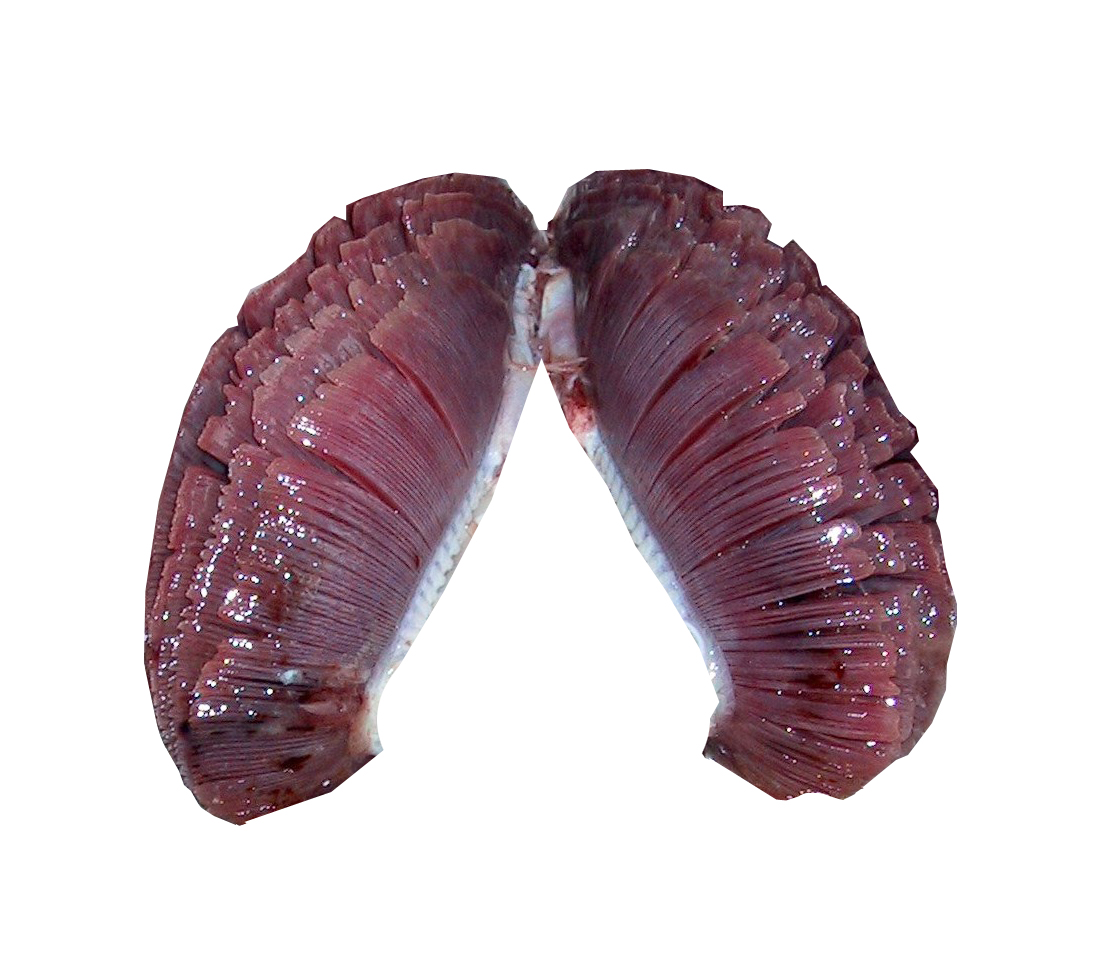
The red gills detached from the tuna head on the left

All basal vertebrates (types of fish) breathe with gills. The gills are carried right behind the head, bordering the posterior margins of a series of openings from the esophagus to the exterior. Each gill is supported by a cartilaginous or bony gill arch. The gills of vertebrates typically develop in the walls of the pharynx, along a series of gill slits opening to the exterior. Most species employ a counter-current exchange system to enhance the diffusion of substances in and out of the gill, with blood and water flowing in opposite directions to each other.

The gills are composed of comb-like filaments, the gill lamellae, which help increase their surface area for oxygen exchange. When a fish breathes, it draws in a mouthful of water at regular intervals. Then it draws the sides of its throat together, forcing the water through the gill openings, so that it passes over the gills to the outside. The bony fish have three pairs of arches, cartilaginous fish have five to seven pairs, while the primitive jawless fish have seven. The vertebrate ancestor no doubt had more arches, as some of their chordate relatives have more than 50 pairs of gills.

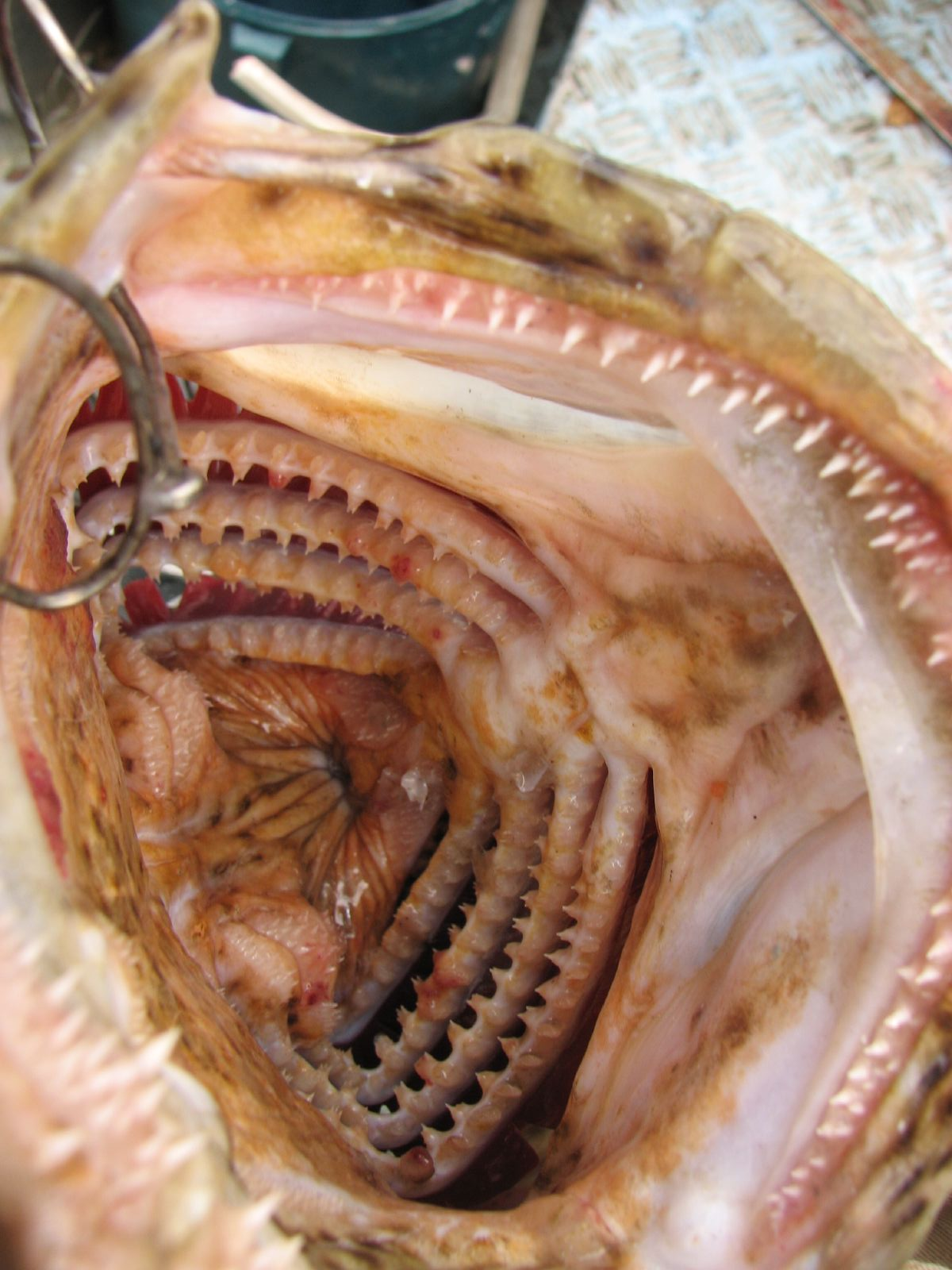
Pharynx and gill rakers in an estuary cod

Gills usually consist of thin filaments of tissue, branches, or slender tufted processes that have a highly folded surface to increase surface area. The high surface area is crucial to the gas exchange of aquatic organisms as water contains only a small fraction of the dissolved oxygen that air does. A cubic meter of air contains about 250 grams of oxygen at STP. The concentration of oxygen in water is lower than air and it diffuses more slowly. In a litre of freshwater the oxygen content is 8 cm^{3} per litre compared to 210 in the same volume of air. Water is 777 times more dense than air and is 100 times more viscous. Oxygen has a diffusion rate in air 10,000 times greater than in water. The use of sac-like lungs to remove oxygen from water would not be efficient enough to sustain life. Rather than using lungs "Gaseous exchange takes place across the surface of highly vascularised gills over which a one-way current of water is kept flowing by a specialised pumping mechanism. The density of the water prevents the gills from collapsing and lying on top of each other, which is what happens when a fish is taken out of water."

Higher vertebrates do not develop gills, the gill arches form during fetal development, and lay the basis of essential structures such as jaws, the thyroid gland, the larynx, the columella (corresponding to the stapes in mammals) and in mammals the malleus and incus. Fish gill slits may be the evolutionary ancestors of the tonsils, thymus gland, and Eustachian tubes, as well as many other structures derived from the embryonic branchial pouches.

== Bony fish ==
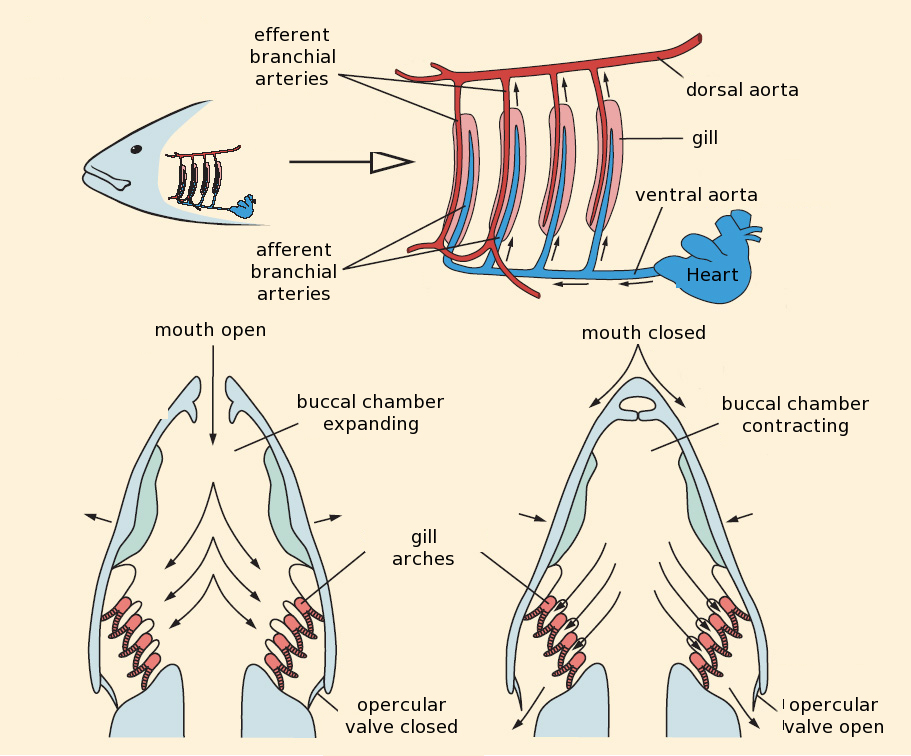
Fish gill respiration

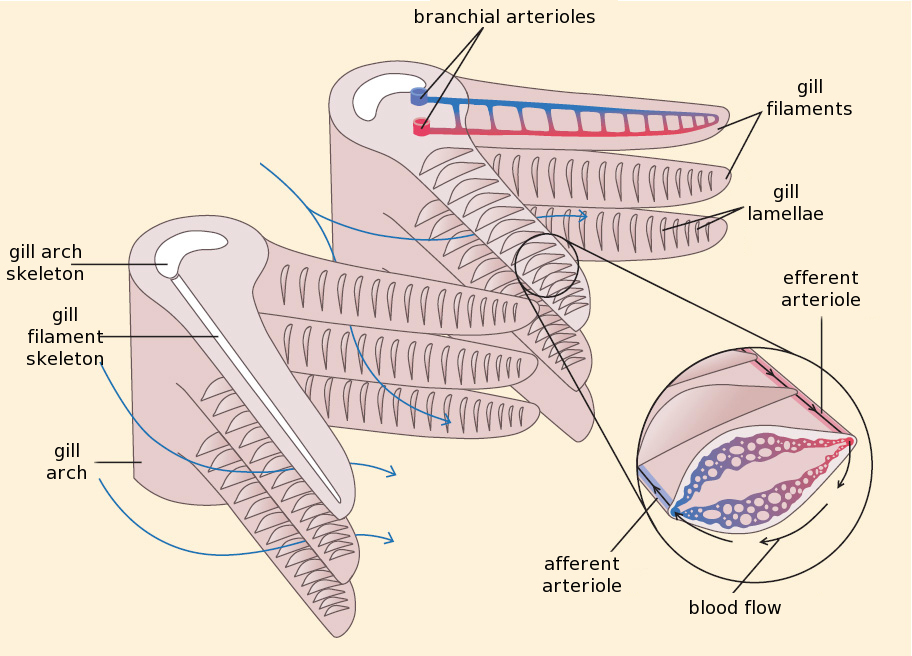
Fish gill structure

In bony fish, the gills lie in a branchial chamber covered by a bony operculum (branchia is an Ancient Greek word for gills). The great majority of bony fish species have five pairs of gills, although a few have lost some over the course of evolution. The operculum can be important in adjusting the pressure of water inside of the pharynx to allow proper ventilation of the gills, so that bony fish do not have to rely on ram ventilation (and hence near constant motion) to breathe. Valves inside the mouth keep the water from escaping.

The gill arches of bony fish typically have no septum, so that the gills alone project from the arch, supported by individual gill rays. Some species retain gill rakers. Though all but the most primitive bony fish lack a spiracle, the pseudobranch associated with it often remains, being located at the base of the operculum. This is, however, often greatly reduced, consisting of a small mass of cells without any remaining gill-like structure.

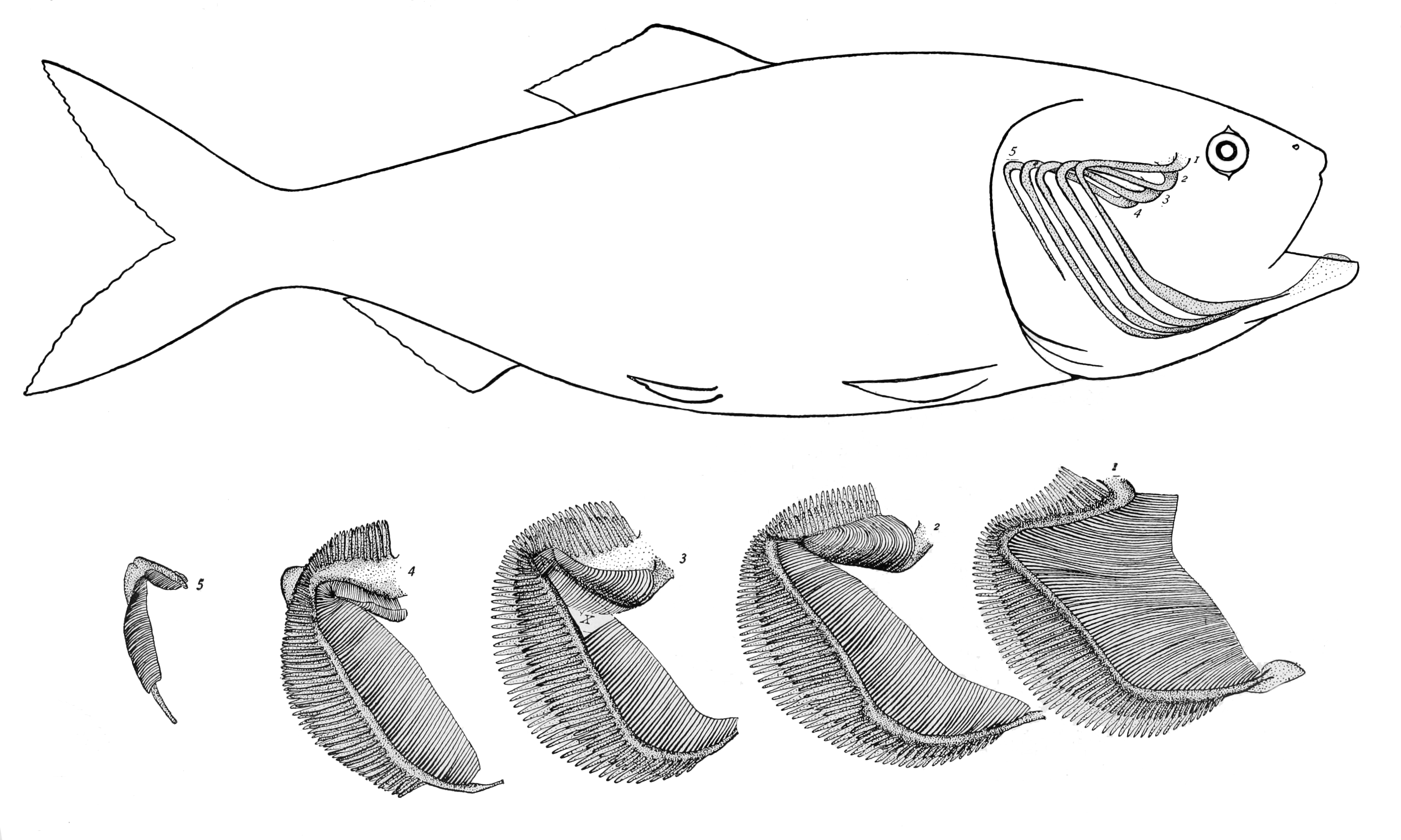
Most bony fish have five gills

Fish transfer oxygen from the sea water to their blood using a highly efficient mechanism called countercurrent exchange. Countercurrent exchange means the flow of water over the gills is in the opposite direction to the flow of blood through the capillaries in the lamellae. The effect of this is that the blood flowing in the capillaries always encounters water with a higher oxygen concentration, allowing diffusion to occur all the way along the lamellae. As a result, the gills can extract over 80% of the oxygen available in the water.

Marine teleosts also use their gills to excrete osmolytes (e.g. Na^{+}, Cl^{−}). The gills' large surface area tends to create a problem for fish that seek to regulate the osmolarity of their internal fluids. Seawater contains more osmolytes than the fish's internal fluids, so marine fishes naturally lose water through their gills via osmosis. To regain the water, marine fishes drink large amounts of sea water while simultaneously expending energy to excrete salt through the Na^{+}/K^{+}-ATPase ionocytes (formerly known as mitochondrion-rich cells and chloride cells). Conversely, freshwater has less osmolytes than the fish's internal fluids. Therefore, freshwater fishes must utilize their gill ionocytes to attain ions from their environment to maintain optimal blood osmolarity.

In some primitive bony fishes and amphibians, the larvae bear external gills, branching off from the gill arches. These are reduced in adulthood, their function taken over by the gills proper in fishes and by lungs in most amphibians. Some amphibians retain the external larval gills in adulthood, the complex internal gill system as seen in fish apparently being irrevocably lost very early in the evolution of tetrapods.

== Cartilaginous fish ==
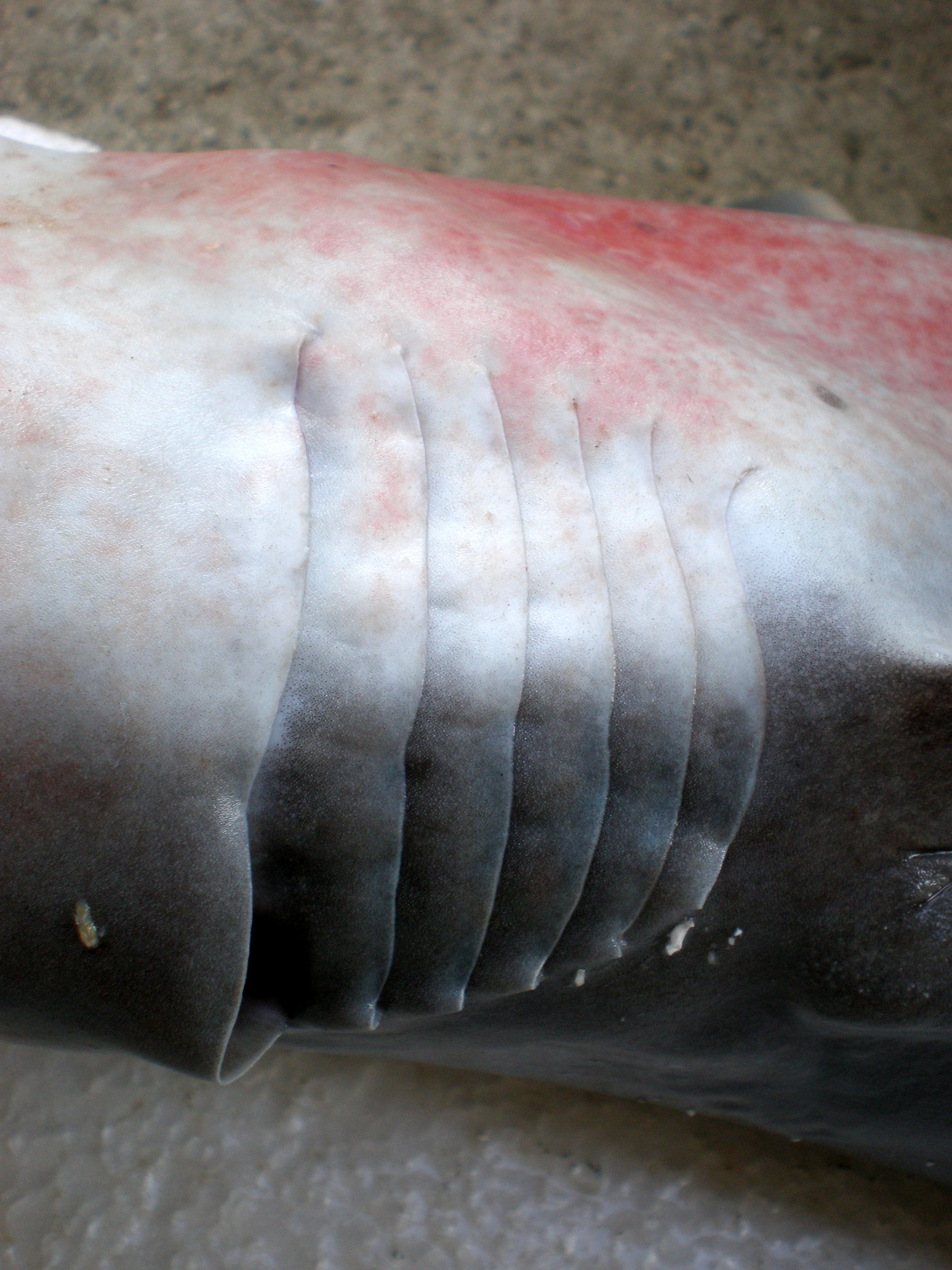
Six gill slits in a bigeyed sixgill shark; most sharks have only five

Sharks and rays typically have five pairs of gill slits that open directly to the outside of the body, though some more primitive sharks have six or seven pairs. Adjacent slits are separated by a cartilaginous gill arch from which projects a long sheet-like septum, partly supported by a further piece of cartilage called the gill ray. The individual lamellae of the gills lie on either side of the septum. The base of the arch may also support gill rakers, small projecting elements that help to filter food from the water.

A smaller opening, the spiracle, lies in the back of the first gill slit. This bears a small pseudobranch that resembles a gill in structure, but only receives blood already oxygenated by the true gills. The spiracle is thought to be homologous to the ear opening in higher vertebrates.

Most sharks rely on ram ventilation, forcing water into the mouth and over the gills by rapidly swimming forward. In slow-moving or bottom dwelling species, especially among skates and rays, the spiracle may be enlarged, and the fish breathes by sucking water through this opening, instead of through the mouth.

Chimaeras differ from other cartilaginous fish, having lost both the spiracle and the fifth gill slit. The remaining slits are covered by an operculum, developed from the septum of the gill arch in front of the first gill.

The shared trait of breathing via gills in bony fish and cartilaginous fish is a famous example of symplesiomorphy. Bony fish are more closely related to terrestrial vertebrates, which evolved out of a clade of bony fishes that breathe through their skin or lungs, than they are to the sharks, rays, and the other cartilaginous fish. Their kind of gill respiration is shared by the "fishes" because it was present in their common ancestor and lost in the other living vertebrates. But based on this shared trait, we cannot infer that bony fish are more closely related to sharks and rays than they are to terrestrial vertebrates.

== Lampreys and hagfish ==
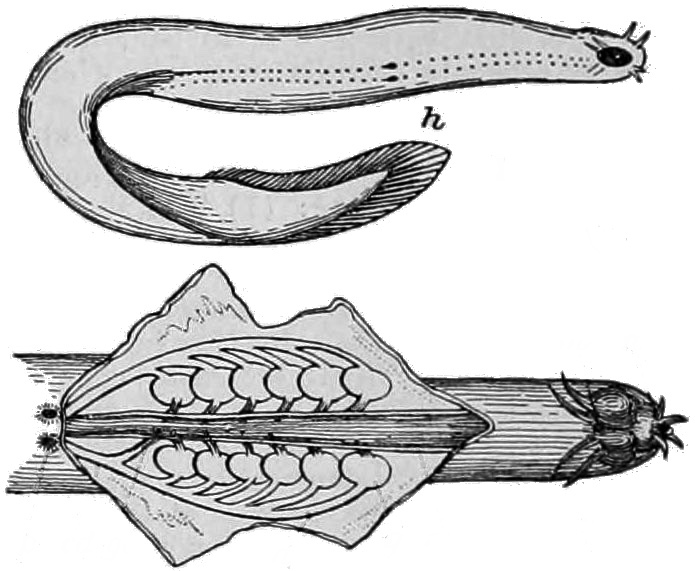
Outline of a hagfish, showing above the two ventral openings (h) by which the water escapes from the gills, and in the dissection below the spherical pouches which contain the gills

Lampreys and hagfish do not have gill slits as such. Instead, the gills are contained in spherical pouches, with a circular opening to the outside. Like the gill slits of higher fish, each pouch contains two gills. In some cases, the openings may be fused together, effectively forming an operculum. Lampreys have seven pairs of pouches, while hagfishes may have six to fourteen, depending on the species. In the hagfish, the pouches connect with the pharynx internally. In adult lampreys, a separate respiratory tube develops beneath the pharynx proper, separating food and water from respiration by closing a valve at its anterior end.

== Breathing without gills ==
Some fish can at least partially respire without gills. In some species cutaneous respiration accounts for 5 to 40 per cent of the total respiration, depending on temperature. Cutaneous respiration is more important in species that breathe air, such as mudskippers and reedfish, and in such species can account for nearly half the total respiration.

Fish from multiple groups can live out of the water for extended time periods.

Air breathing fish can be divided into obligate air breathers and facultative air breathers. Obligate air breathers, such as the African lungfish, are obliged to breathe air periodically or they suffocate. Facultative air breathers, such as the catfish Hypostomus plecostomus, only breathe air if they need to and can otherwise rely on their gills for oxygen. Most air breathing fish are facultative air breathers that avoid the energetic cost of rising to the surface and the fitness cost of exposure to surface predators.

Catfish of the families Loricariidae, Callichthyidae, and Scoloplacidae absorb air through their digestive tracts.

== Parasites on gills ==
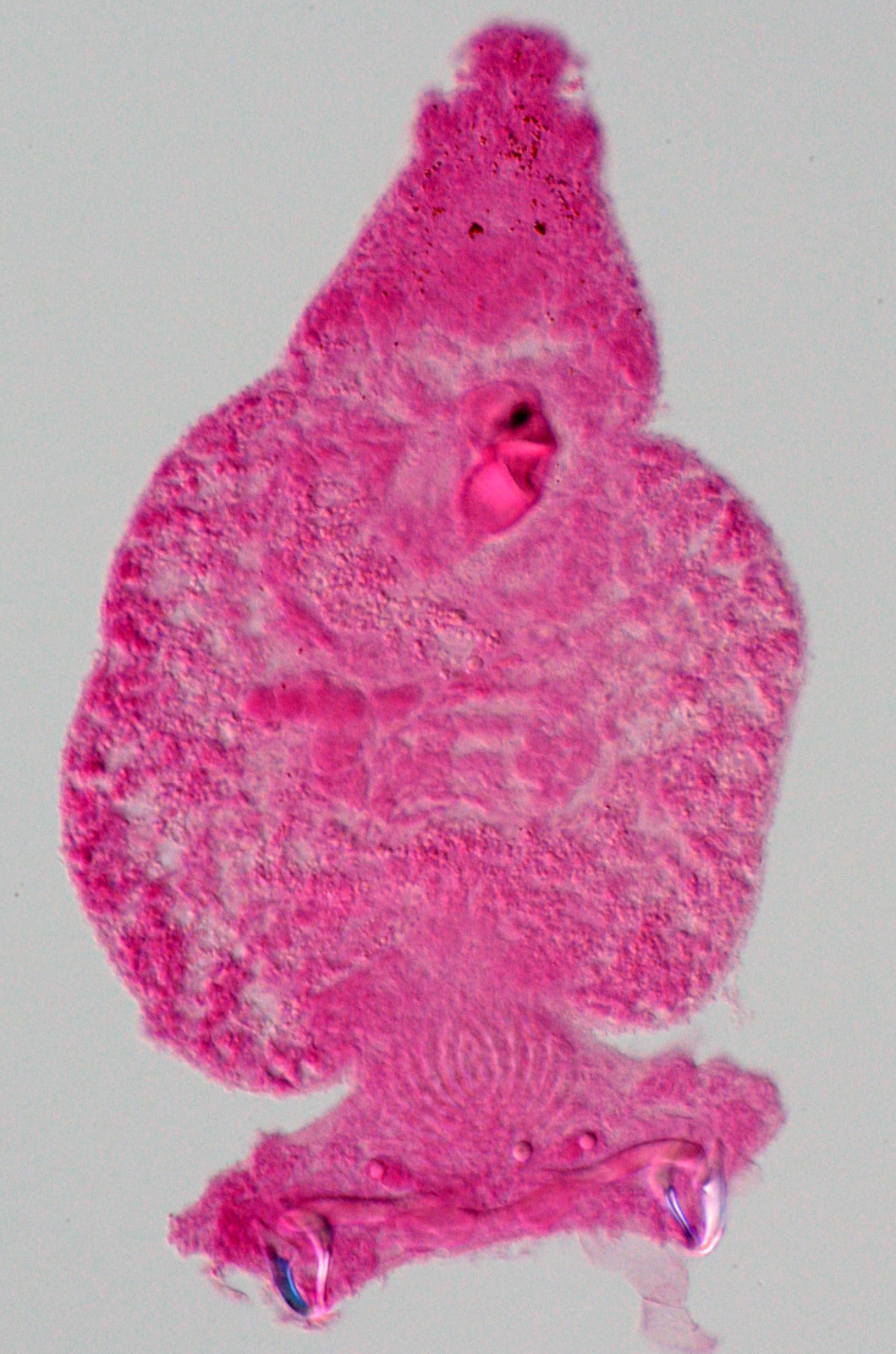
Monogenean parasite on the gill of a grouper

Fish gills are the preferred habitat of many ectoparasites (parasites attached to the gill but living out of it); the most commons are monogeneans and certain groups of parasitic copepods, which can be extremely numerous. Other ectoparasites found on gills are leeches and, in seawater, larvae of gnathiid isopods. Endoparasites (parasites living inside the gills) include encysted adult didymozoid trematodes, a few trichosomoidid nematodes of the genus Huffmanela, including Huffmanela ossicola which lives within the gill bone, and the encysted parasitic turbellarian Paravortex. Various protists and Myxosporea are also parasitic on gills, where they form cysts.

== See also ==
- Aquatic respiration
- Book lung
- Gill raker
- Gill slit
- Lung
- Artificial gills (human)

== Further references ==
- Evans, D H; Piermarini, P M; Choe, K P (2005). "The multifunctional fish gill: dominant site of gas exchange, osmoregulation, acid-base regulation, and excretion of nitrogenous waste". Physiological Reviews. 85 (1): 97–177. doi:10.1152/physrev.00050.2003. PMID 15618479.
