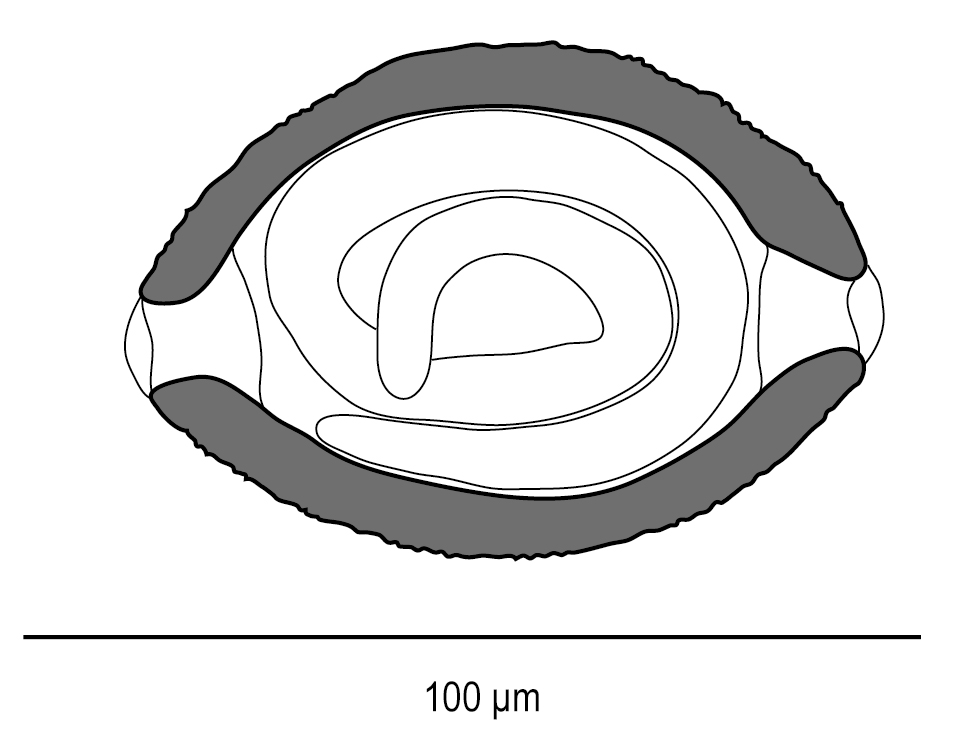
- Egg of Huffmanela lata

Scientific classification
- Kingdom: Animalia
- Phylum: Nematoda
- Class: Enoplea
- Order: Trichocephalida
- Family: Trichosomoididae
- Genus: Huffmanela
- Species: H. lata

Binomial name
- Huffmanela lata Justine, 2005

= Huffmanela lata =

Species of roundworm

Huffmanela lata is a parasitic nematode. It has been observed on the skin of the grey reef shark Carcharhinus amblyrhynchos off New Caledonia. This species has only been reported once in the scientific literature.

== Description ==
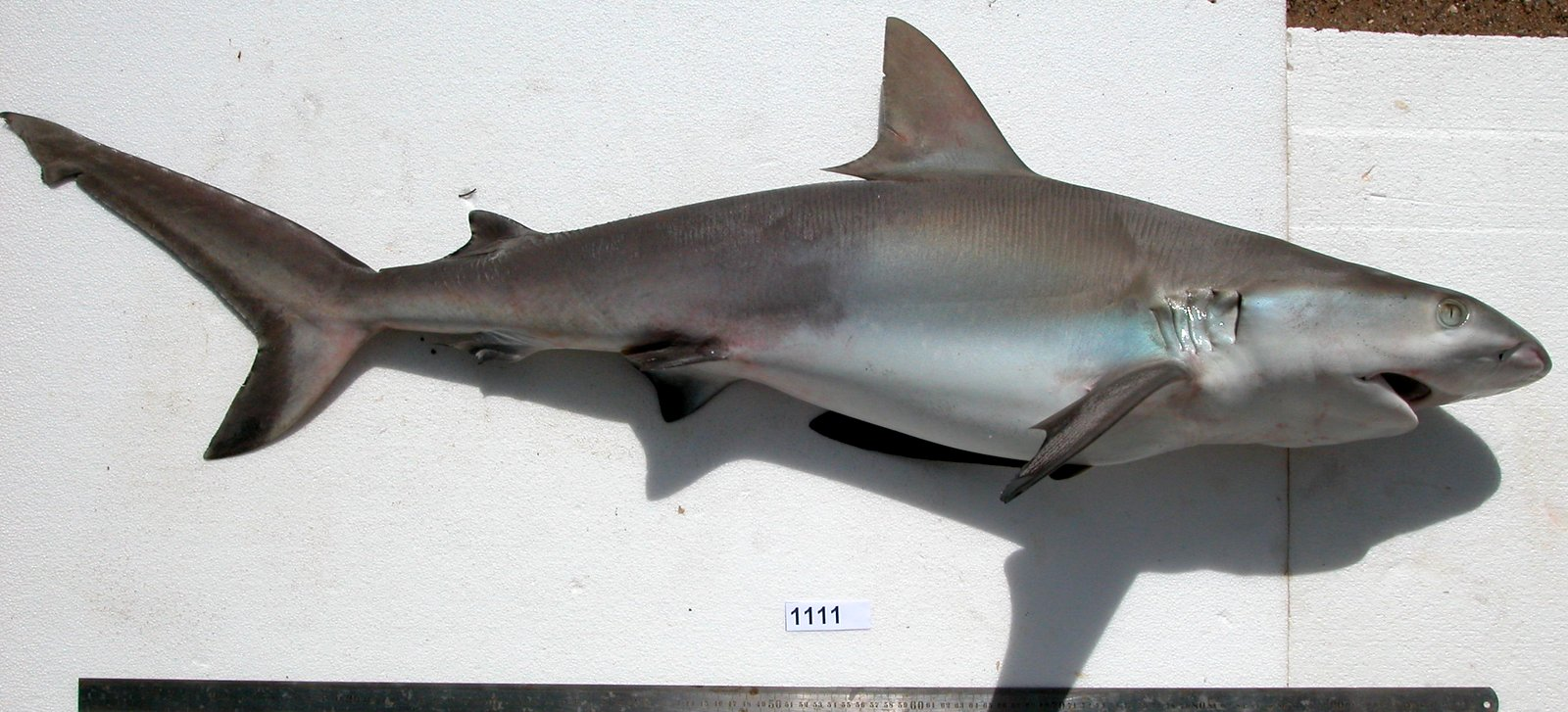
The grey reef shark (Carcharhinus amblyrhynchos) from New Caledonia in which Huffmanela lata was discovered

The adults of Huffmanela lata are unknown, only the eggs were described. The eggs are 77–88 (mean 84) micrometers in length and 52–63 (mean 57) micrometers in width, with a thick (6–8 micrometers) shell, apparently spinose. Mobile larvae, 200–250 micrometers in length, were visible in the eggs.

== Biology ==
As it is often the case for species of Huffmanela, the species was found because the accumulation of its eggs produced a black spot; in this particular case, the black spot was on the skin of the shark, near the gill. No adult were found.
The biology of Huffmanela lata is unknown. Its eggs are probably released from the skin with the turnover of living tissues and immediately continue their life-cycle. The intervention of an intermediary host in the life-cycle (possibly an invertebrate) is possible, as it has been suggested for other species of Huffmanela. However, it is also possible that transmission of the parasite from shark to shark occurs when sharks congregate and skin-to-skin contacts between sharks are frequent. Other species of Huffmanela are known from other sharks.

== See also ==
- Huffmanela branchialis
- Huffmanela filamentosa
- Huffmanela ossicola
