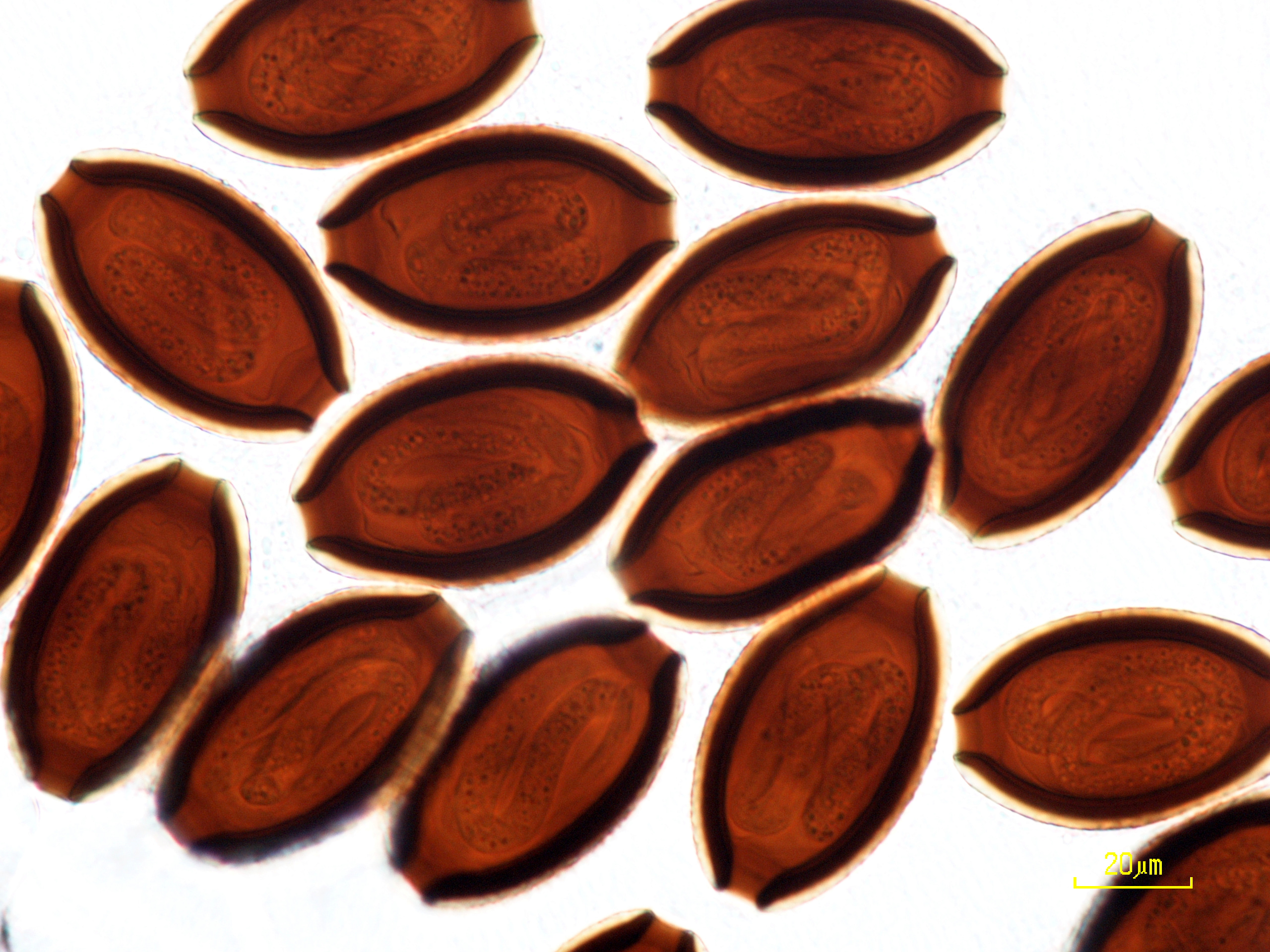
- Eggs of Huffmanela hamo

Scientific classification
- Kingdom: Animalia
- Phylum: Nematoda
- Class: Enoplea
- Order: Trichocephalida
- Family: Trichosomoididae
- Subfamily: Huffmanelinae
- Genus: Huffmanela; Moravec, 1987

= Huffmanela =

Genus of roundworms

Huffmanela is a genus of parasitic nematodes, belonging to the family Trichosomoididae.

== Morphology ==
As other nematodes, species of Huffmanela are elongate and vermiform. They are especially thin and small. The male is smaller than the female. The stichosome is composed of a single row of stichocytes (glandular cells). The advances eggs contain larvae and have strongly pigmented, dark, often conspicuously thick walls comprising three layers, and polar plugs.

The structure of the egg of Huffmanela nematodes has been redescribed in great detail in 2023, with a new anatomical and terminological framework.

== Biology ==
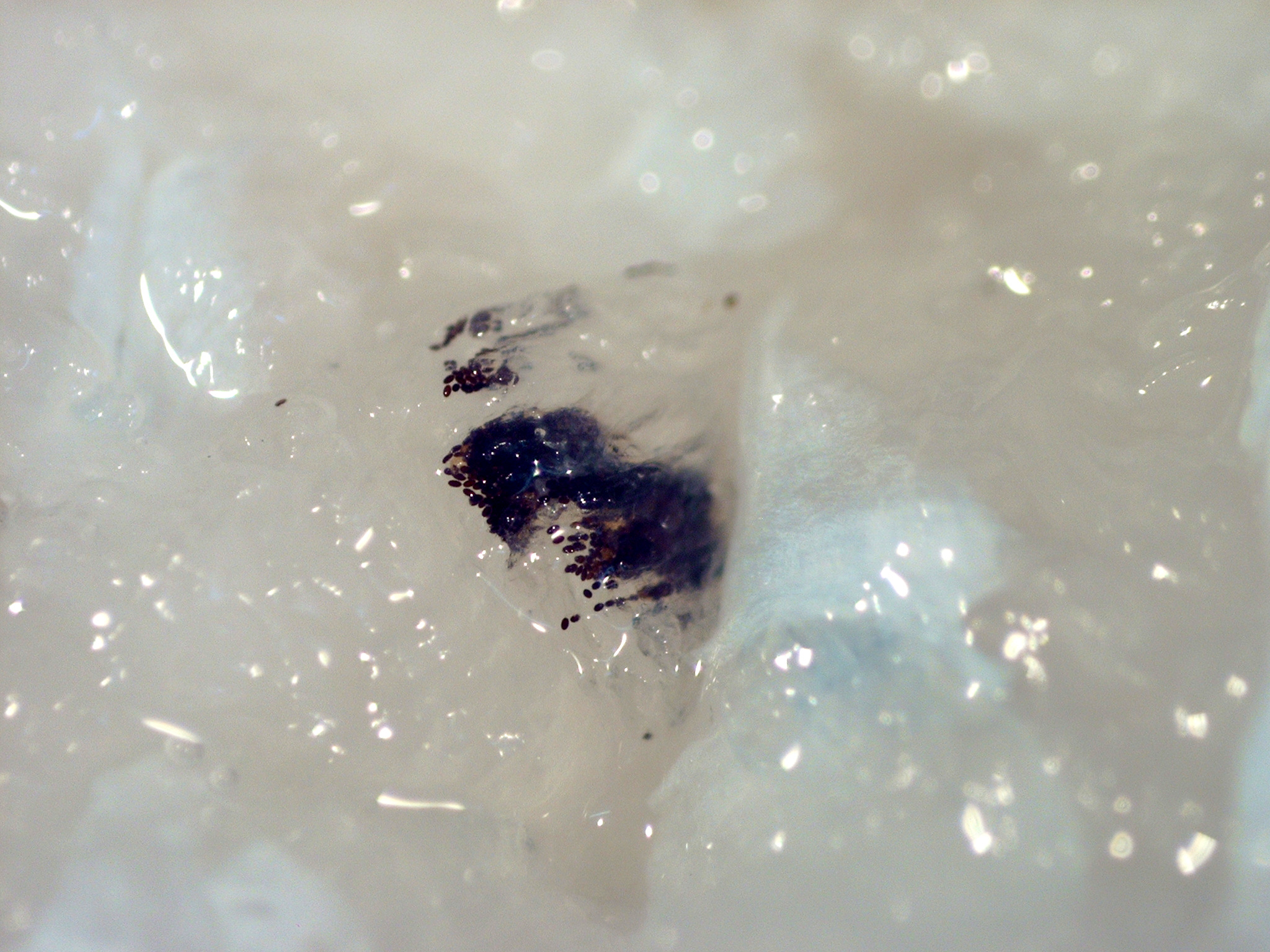
Huffmanela hamo eggs in muscles of Muraenesox cinereus

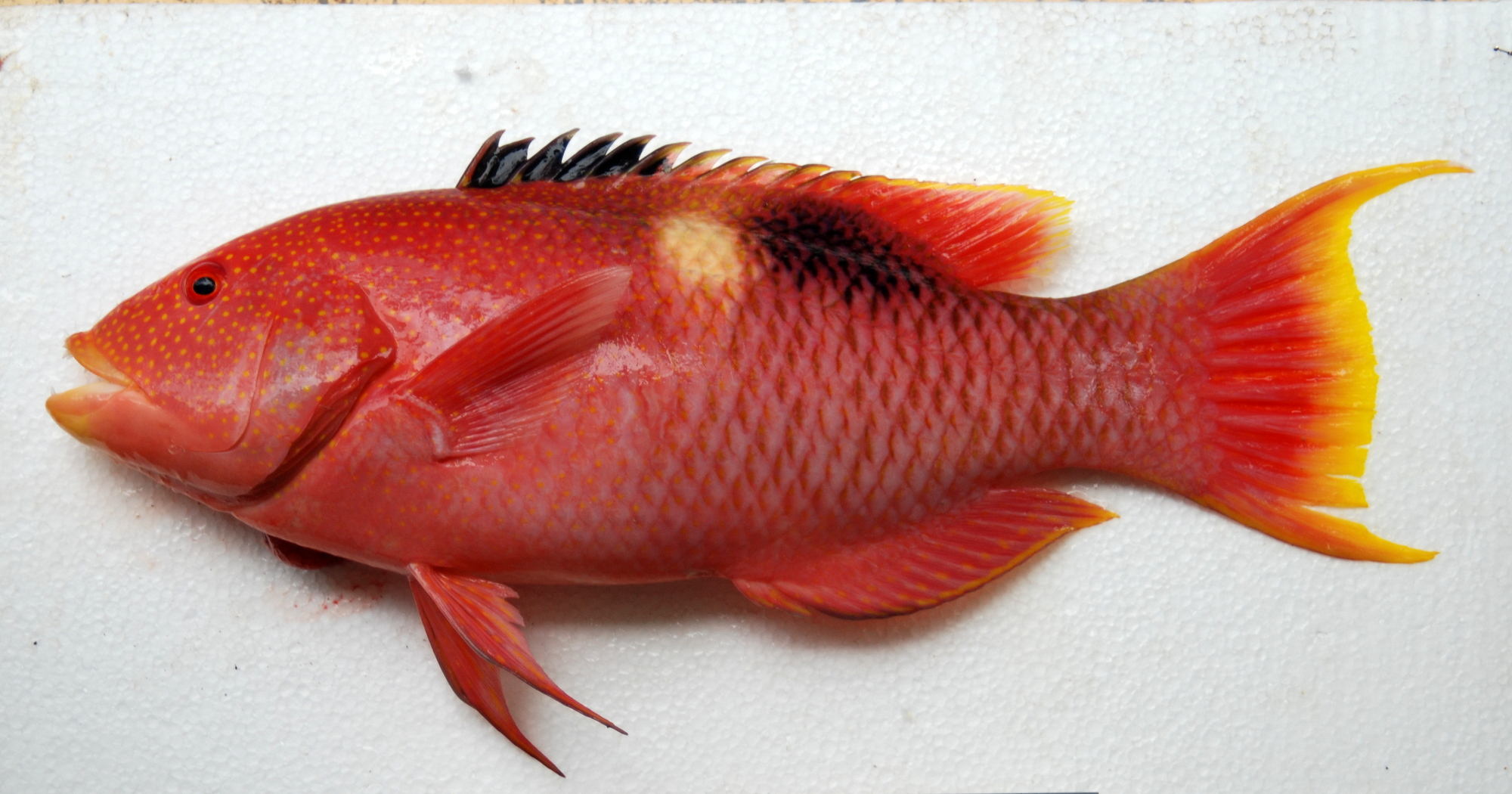
The Golden-spot hogfish (Bodianus perditio), has its bones parasitized by Huffmanela ossicola in New Caledonia

Nematodes of the genus Huffmanela are all parasites of fishes. They infect various tissues (skin, mucosa, musculature, swimbladder wall, intestine wall, and even within the bones) of elasmobranchs (sharks) and bony fishes. The life cycle of the marine species is not known.
Females lay eggs in the host's tissues at a very early stage and eggs continue to develop after being laid. Eggs usually occur as masses in the tissues of the hosts, occurring frequently as conspicuous black spots in the flesh or other organs of fish; these black spots may constitute a commercial problem.

== Life cycle ==
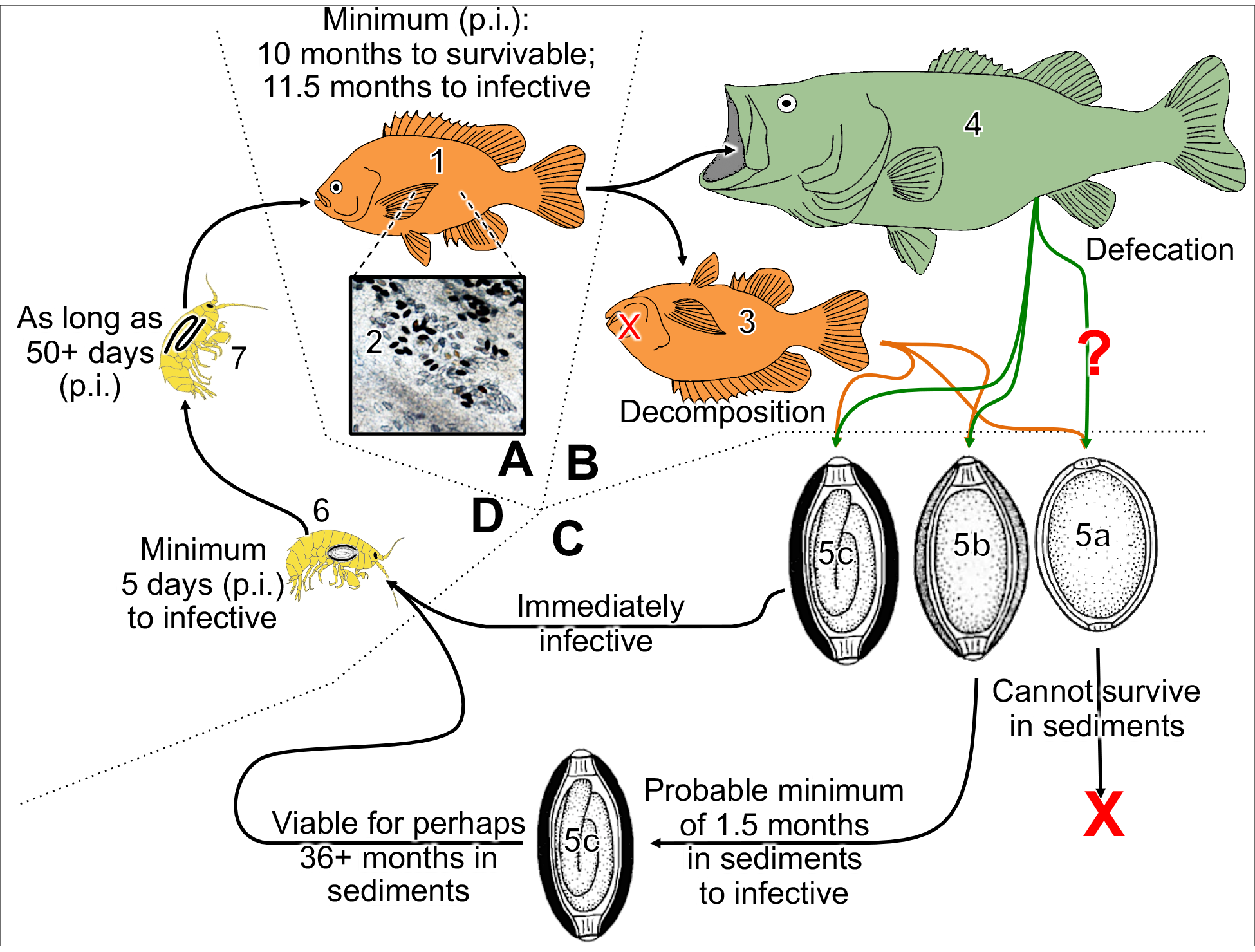
Life cycle of Huffmanela huffmani Moravec, 1987

The life cycle of Huffmanela huffmani, the only species from freshwater, has been elucidated in 2016; it includes amphipods as intermediate hosts. The diagrams shows the steps in the life cycle of Huffmanela huffmani.

- A – adults lay eggs in definitive host; at least 7.5 months must pass between ingestion of viable larva and the appearance of fertilised eggs in the host swim bladder, but eggs do not become fully larvated and infective to amphipods until 11.5 months post infection (p.i.): 1 – centrarchid definitive host; 2 – photomicrograph of swim bladder tissue showing eggs in various stages of development;
- B – release of eggs from definitive host: 3 – definitive host dies and decomposes to release eggs; 4 – definitive host is consumed by piscivorous fish and viable eggs with sufficiently developed shells pass out in faeces;
- C – eggs free in sediments: 5a – young eggs (<10 months p.i.) with inadequately developed shells will not survive in environment or passage through piscivore gastrointestinal (GI) tract; 5b – unlarvated eggs old enough to have fully developed egg shells (>10 months p.i.) can survive in environment and through GI tract of piscivore, but are uninfective to amphipods until they become fully larvated while in sediments; 5c – fully larvated eggs (≥11.5 months p.i.) are immediately infective to amphipods and are still infective to amphipods after 36+ months in sediments;
- D – fully larvated eggs ingested by amphipod: 6 – larvae hatch and migrate to hemocoel where they must remain for at least 5 days p.i. before being infective to definitive host; 7 – larva in hemocoel of amphipod and infective to centrarchid. Life cycle can be completed in a theoretical minimum of 12 months, but can probably take longer than 36 months.

The life cycle of marine species is still unknown.

== Systematics ==
In zoology, new species are generally described only from adult specimens; however, in the case of Huffmanela species, it happens that the eggs are often the only stage which is known. For this reason, several species of Huffmanela have been described from eggs only. This is exceptional but perfectly valid for the International Code of Zoological Nomenclature, and eggs are considered syntypes of the new species.

== Classification ==
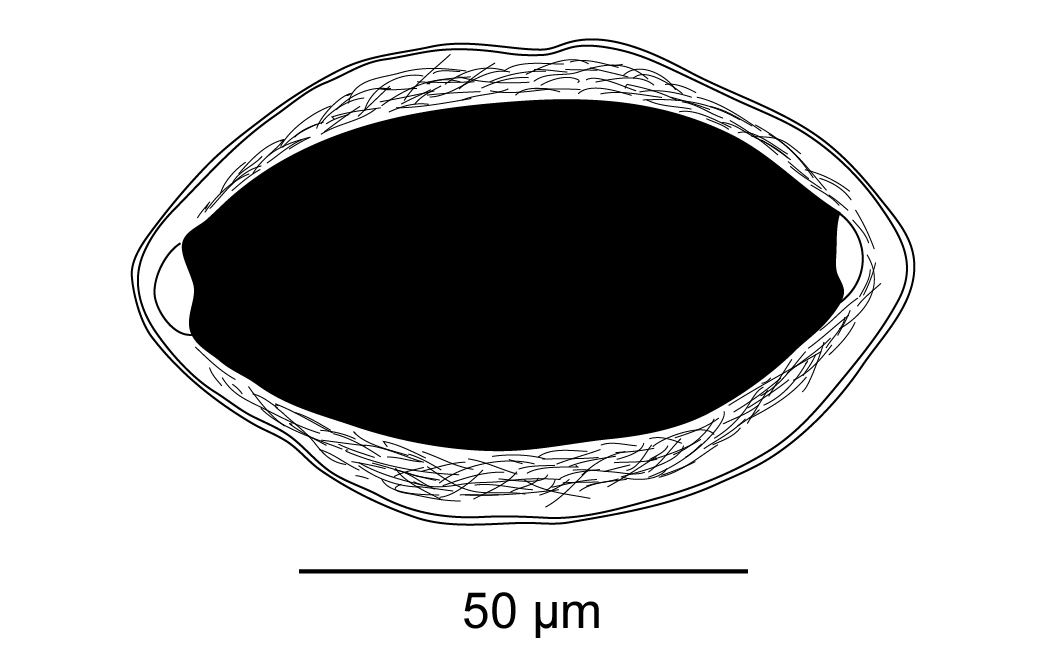
Huffmanela ossicola, a species described only from its eggs

According to Moravec(2001), Huffmanela is the single genus within the subfamily Huffmanelinae Moravec, 2001.
The type-species of the genus Huffmanela is Huffmanela carcharini (McCallum, 1925) Moravec, 1987, a species originally described as Capillaria carcharhini MacCallum, 1925 and Capillaria spinosa MacCallum, 1926 by MacCallum.

Twenty species of Huffmanela have been described with a binomial name (or Latin name)

Of these 20 species, only 5 have their adult forms known and described (Table below); all others have been described from eggs only. Hosts include a variety of fish species and families (Table below), generally marine, with a single exception, H. huffmani in a freshwater fish host.

In addition to these described species, about half a dozen cases of Huffmanela spp., or unnamed species, have been reported in various fish hosts.

Described species of Huffmanela, description of their adult form, and host fish species and family

Species	Adult	Hosts
Huffmanela balista Justine, 2007	described	Abalistes stellatus (Balistidae)
Huffmanela banningi Moravec, 1987	unknown	Cynoglossus browni (Cynoglossidae)
Huffmanela branchialis Justine, 2004	unknown	Nemipterus furcosus (Nemipteridae)
Huffmanela canadensis Moravec, Conboy & Speare, 2005	described	Sebastes spp. (Sebastidae)
Huffmanela carcharini (MacCallum, 1925) Moravec, 1987	unknown	Carcharhinus melanopterus, C. plumbeus (Carcharhinidae)
Huffmanela filamentosa Justine, 2004	unknown	Gymnocranius grandoculis (Lethrinidae)
Huffmanela hamo Justine & Iwaki, 2014	unknown	Muraenesox cinereus (Muraenesocidae)
Huffmanela huffmani Moravec, 1987	described	Lepomis spp., Amblopites rupestris, Micropterus salmoides (Centrarchidae)
Huffmanela japonica Moravecet al., 1998	unknown	Upeneus japonicus (Mullidae)
Huffmanela lata Justine, 2005	unknown	Carcharhinus amblyrhynchos (Carcharhinidae)
Huffmanela longa Justine, 2007	described	Gymnocranius oblongus, Gymnocranius grandoculis (Lethrinidae)
Huffmanela markgracei Ruiz & Bullard, 2013	unknown	Rhizoprionodon terraenovae (Carcharhinidae)
Huffmanela mexicana Moravec & Fajer-Avila, 2000	unknown	Sphoeroides annulatus (Tetraodontidae)
Huffmanela moraveci Carballo & Navone, 2007	described	Odontesthes smitti, O. nigricans (Atherinopsidae)
Huffmanela oleumimica Ruiz et al., 2012	unknown	Lutjanus campechanus (Lutjanidae)
Huffmanela ossicola Justine, 2004	unknown	Bodianus loxozonus, B. perditio, B. busellatus (Labridae)
Huffmanela paronai Moravec & Garibaldi, 2000	unknown	Xiphias gladius (Xiphiidae)
Huffmanela plectropomi Justine, 2011	unknown	Plectropomus leopardus (Serranidae)
Huffmanela schouteni Moravec & Campbell, 1991	unknown	Hirundichthys affinis, Cheilopogon cyanopterus, C. heterurus (Exocoetidae)
Huffmanela shikokuensis Moravec et al., 1998	unknown	Stephanolepis cirrhifer (Monacanthidae)

== Medical interest ==
All known species of Huffmanela are strictly parasite of fishes, and none can infest humans. However, cases of spurious parasitism have been described in the medical literature from coprological studies. Since infestation of fish are often heavy, with millions of eggs in a single fish, it is understandable that consumption of such an infested fish, even well cooked, can results in numerous eggs in human feces. Because of their polar plugs, eggs of nematodes of the genera Anatrichosoma, Capillaria or Trichuris can sometimes induce misidentifications.
