= Shōken Kamitsukasa =

Japanese writer (1874–1947)

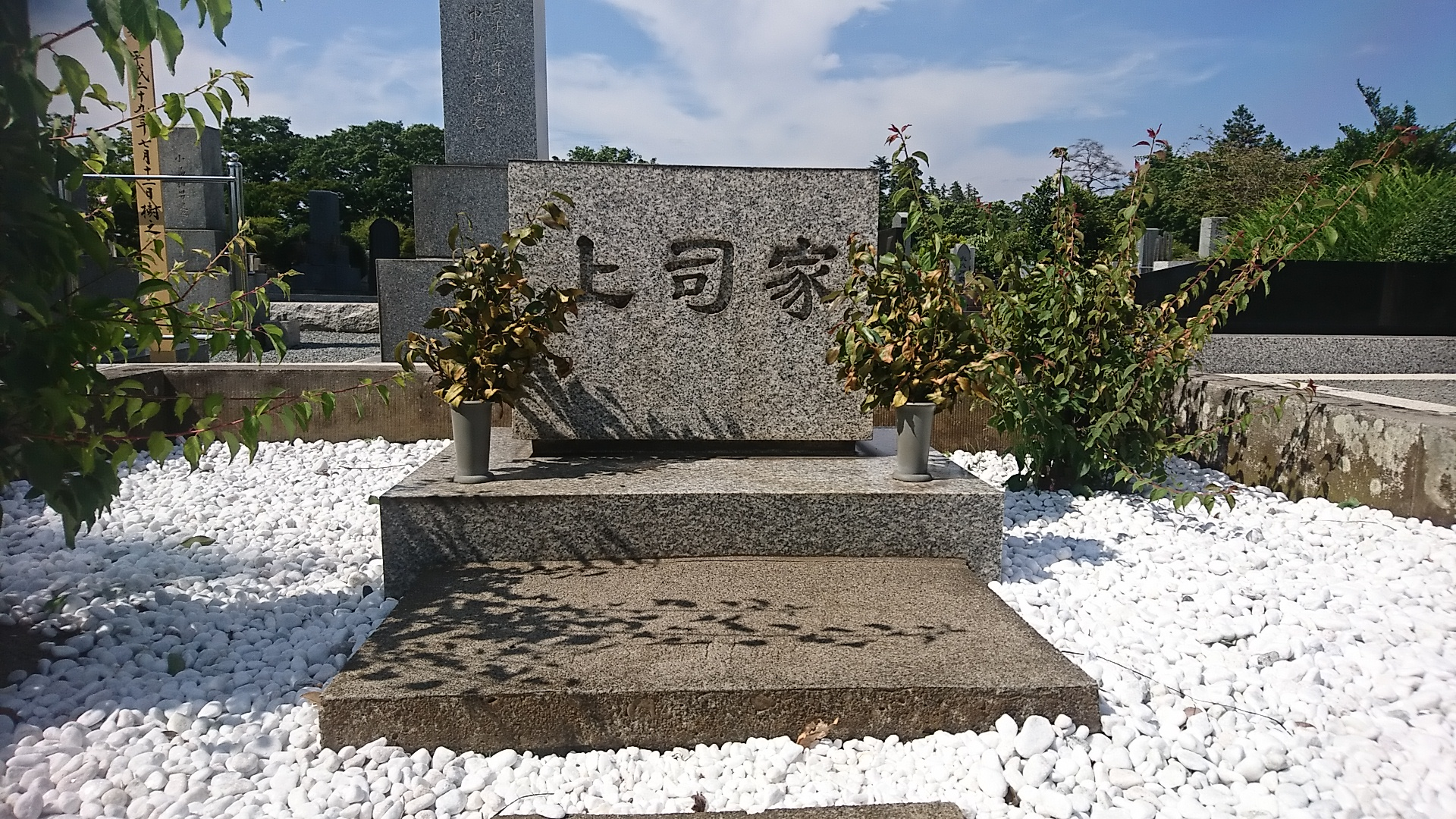
grave of the Kamitsukasa family

Kamitsukasa Shōken (上司 小剣) (1874–1947) was a Japanese novelist and literary critic. Although having initially only primary school education he became a teacher, then joined the editorial staff of Yomiuri Shimbun in 1897, and worked his way up to become chief editor of its literary department until retirement in 1916. He was elected to the Japan Art Academy in 1937. Having begun with stories of local life in Osaka he later took up socialist themes.

His representative short novella of Osaka life is Hamo no Kawa (鱧の皮). This 1914 work, named after a local delicacy still eaten in the Kansai District today, tells of a wife preparing to send the pickled skin of the daggertooth pike conger to her estranged husband in Tokyo as she runs the busy family restaurant.

== Translations ==
Hamo no Kawa was translated into Spanish as: “La piel del hamo" in the multi-author short story collection La sociedad gastronómica y otros cuentos para gourmets (Kappa Bunko, 2016). Hamo no Kawa was translated into English by Andrew Murakami-Smith under the title "The Skin of the Pike Conger Eel" and won the University of Chicago's William F. Sibley Memorial Translation Prize for 2013.
