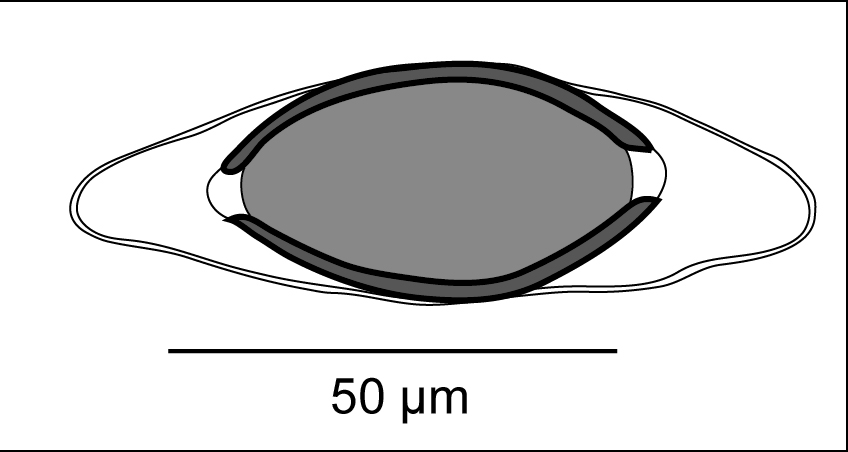
- Egg of Huffmanela branchialis

Scientific classification
- Kingdom: Animalia
- Phylum: Nematoda
- Class: Enoplea
- Order: Trichocephalida
- Family: Trichosomoididae
- Genus: Huffmanela
- Species: H. branchialis

Binomial name
- Huffmanela branchialis Justine, 2004

= Huffmanela branchialis =

Species of roundworm

Huffmanela branchialis is a parasitic nematode It has been observed on the gills of the fork-tailed threadfin bream Nemipterus furcosus, a nemipterid marine fish off New Caledonia. Its eggs are released from the gill mucosa with the turnover of living tissues and immediately continue their life-cycle.

== Description ==
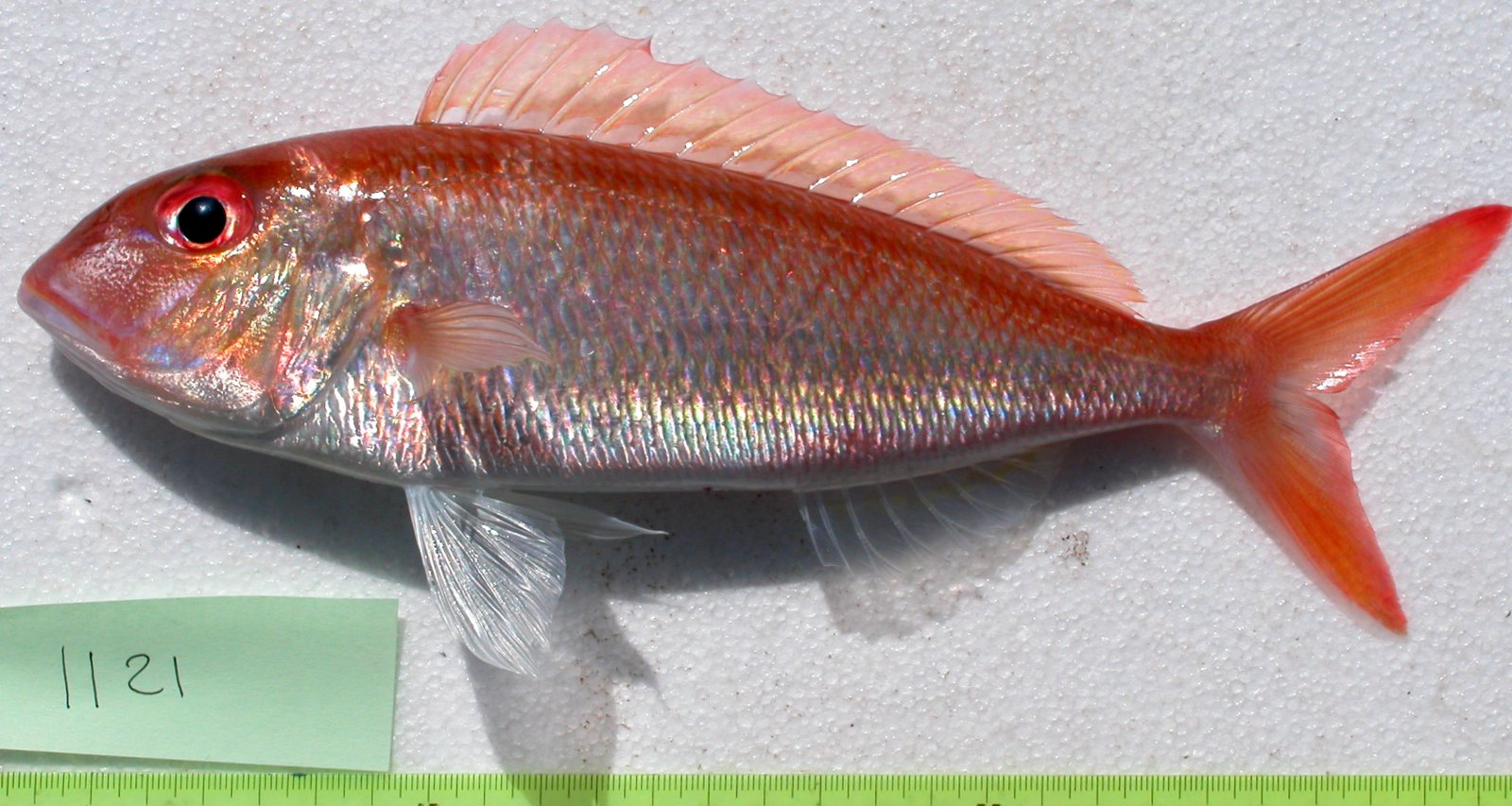
The fork-tailed threadfin bream (Nemipterus furcosus) has its gills parasitized by Huffmanela branchialis in New Caledonia

The adults are unknown, only the eggs were described. The eggs are 45–52 micrometers in length and 23–30 micrometers in width, with thin shells. Each egg is enclosed in a thin membrane forming a spindle-shaped envelope 53–85 micrometers in length.

== See also ==
- Huffmanela filamentosa
- Huffmanela lata
- Huffmanela ossicola
