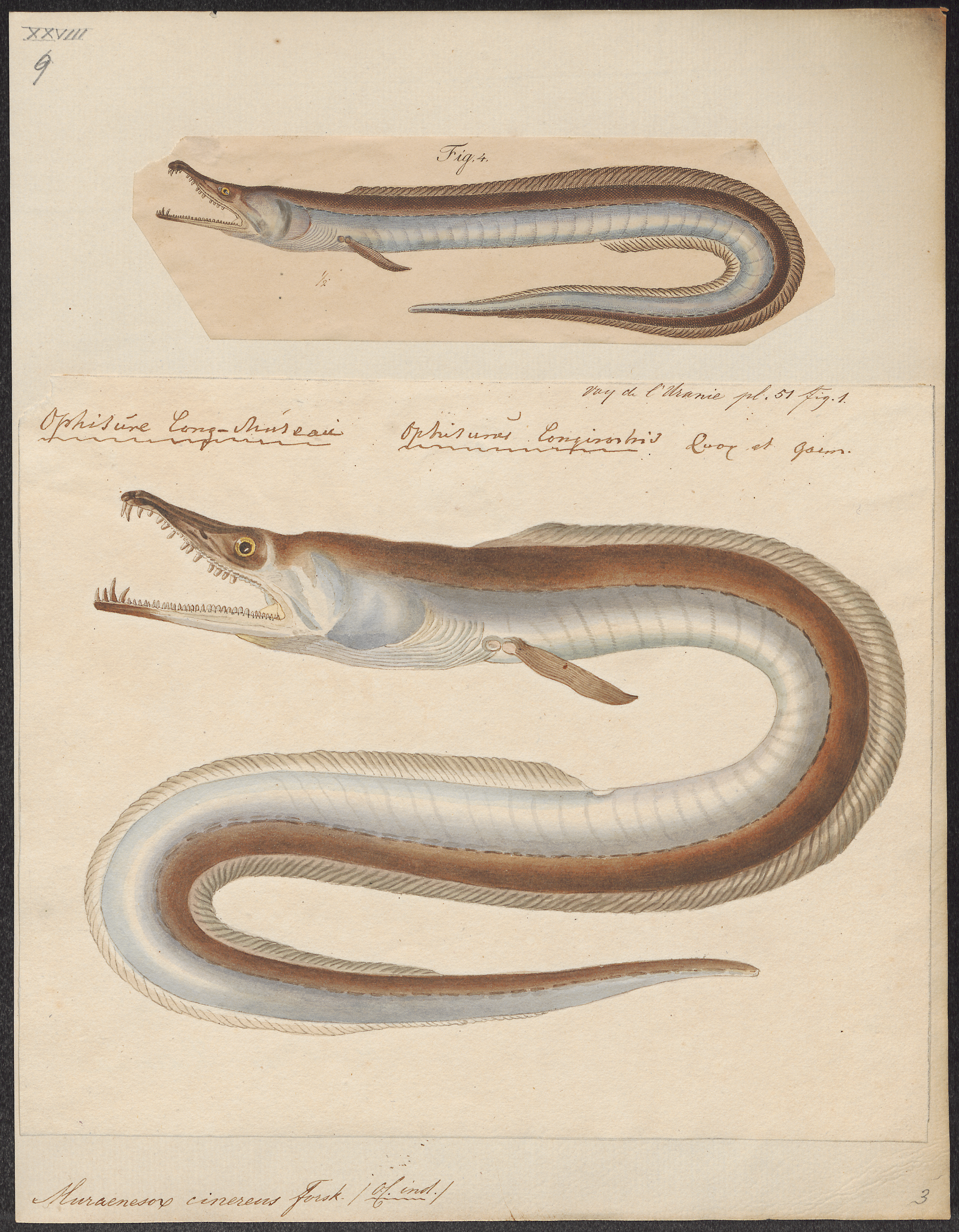

Conservation status
- Least Concern (IUCN 3.1)

Scientific classification
- Kingdom: Animalia
- Phylum: Chordata
- Class: Actinopterygii
- Order: Anguilliformes
- Family: Muraenesocidae
- Genus: Muraenesox
- Species: M. cinereus

Binomial name
- Muraenesox cinereus (Forsskål, 1775)

Synonyms
- Muraena cinerea Forsskål, 1775

= Daggertooth pike conger =

Species of fish

The daggertooth pike conger (Muraenesox cinereus) also known as the darkfin pike eel in Australia, to distinguish it from the related pike-eel (Muraenesox bagio), is a species of eel in the pike conger family, Muraenesocidae. They primarily live on soft bottoms in marine and brackish waters down to a depth of 800 m (2,600 ft), but may enter freshwater. They commonly grow to about 1.5 m (4.9 ft) in length, but may grow as long as 2.2 m (7.2 ft). Daggertooth pike congers occur in the Red Sea, on the coast of the northern Indian Ocean, and in the West Pacific from Indochina to Japan. A single specimen was also reported in the Mediterranean Sea off Israel in 1982.

== Culinary uses ==
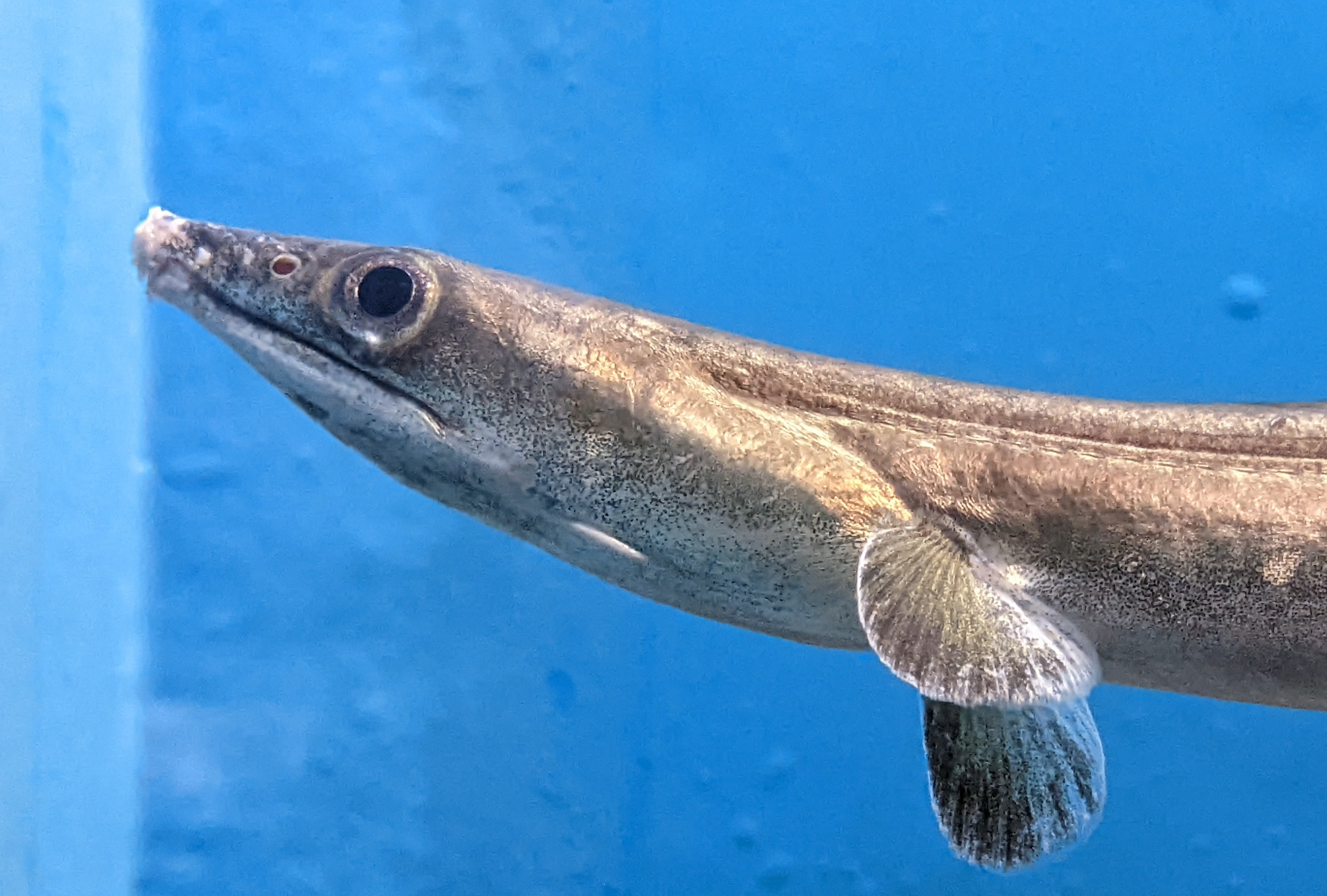
M. cinereus in aquarium

Daggertooth pike conger is a major commercial species, with annual catches reaching about 350,000 tonnes in recent years. The spot reporting the largest landings was Taiwan. It is eaten in Japanese cuisine, where it is known as hamo (ハモ, 鱧). In the Kansai Region, hamo no kawa (pickled conger skins) is a traditional delicacy, and pike conger is a common ingredient in some types of kamaboko (fish cake). It is also frequently canned and exported to Asian markets.

== Parasites ==
As with other fish, the daggertooth pike conger harbours several species of parasites.

A species of trichosomoidid nematode which parasitizes the muscles of the fish off Japan has been described in 2014 and named Huffmanela hamo, in reference to the Japanese name of the fish. Accumulations of eggs of the parasite are visible as 1–2mm black spots in the flesh of the fish. The parasite is rare and the consumption of infected fish meat has no consequences for humans.

== Gallery ==
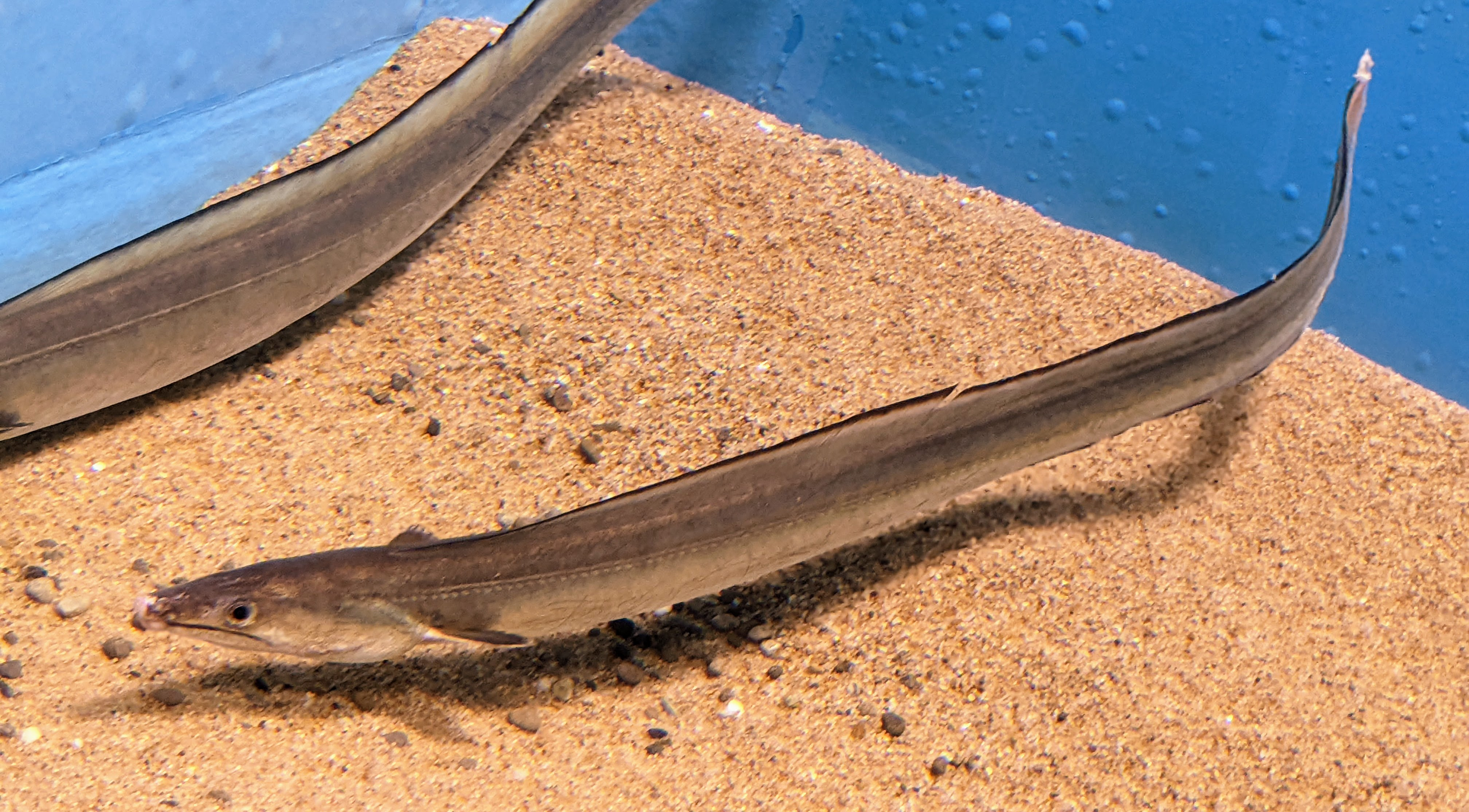
Specimen seen at Nagasaki Penguin Aquarium

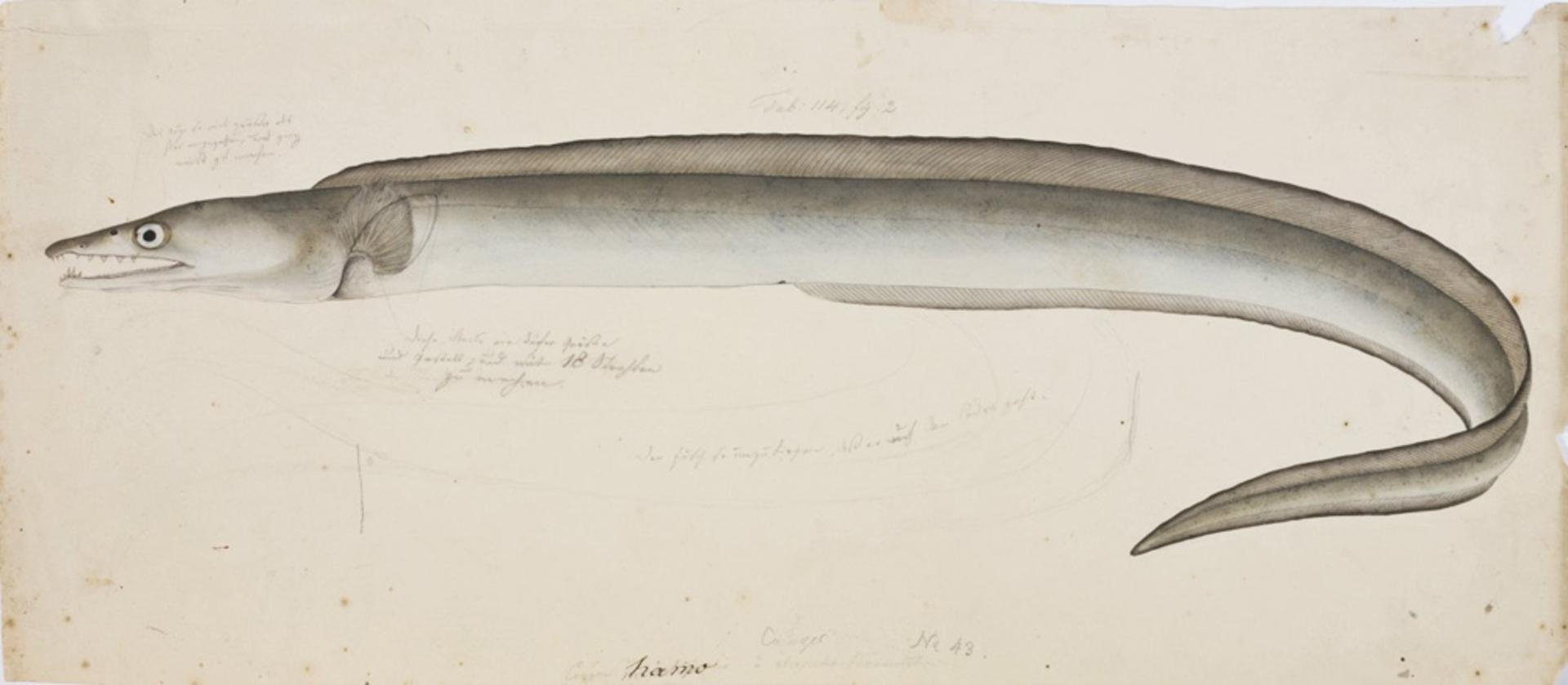
Illustration

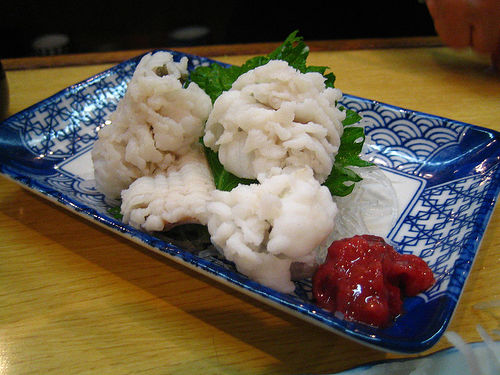
Hamo with pickled plum

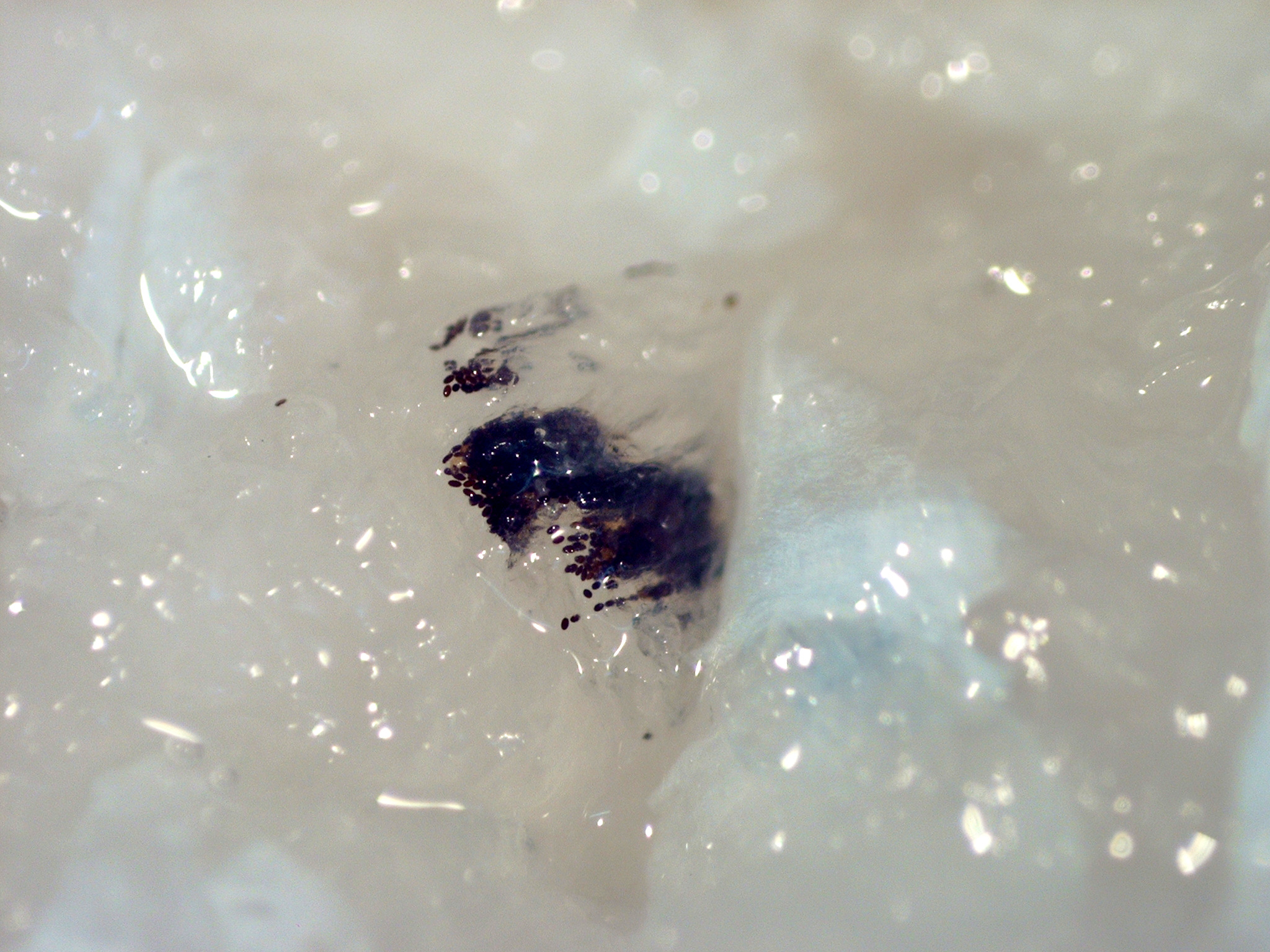
Eggs of Huffmanela hamo in muscles

Global capture production of daggertooth pike conger (M. cinereus) in thousand tonnes from 1950 to 2022, as reported by the FAO
