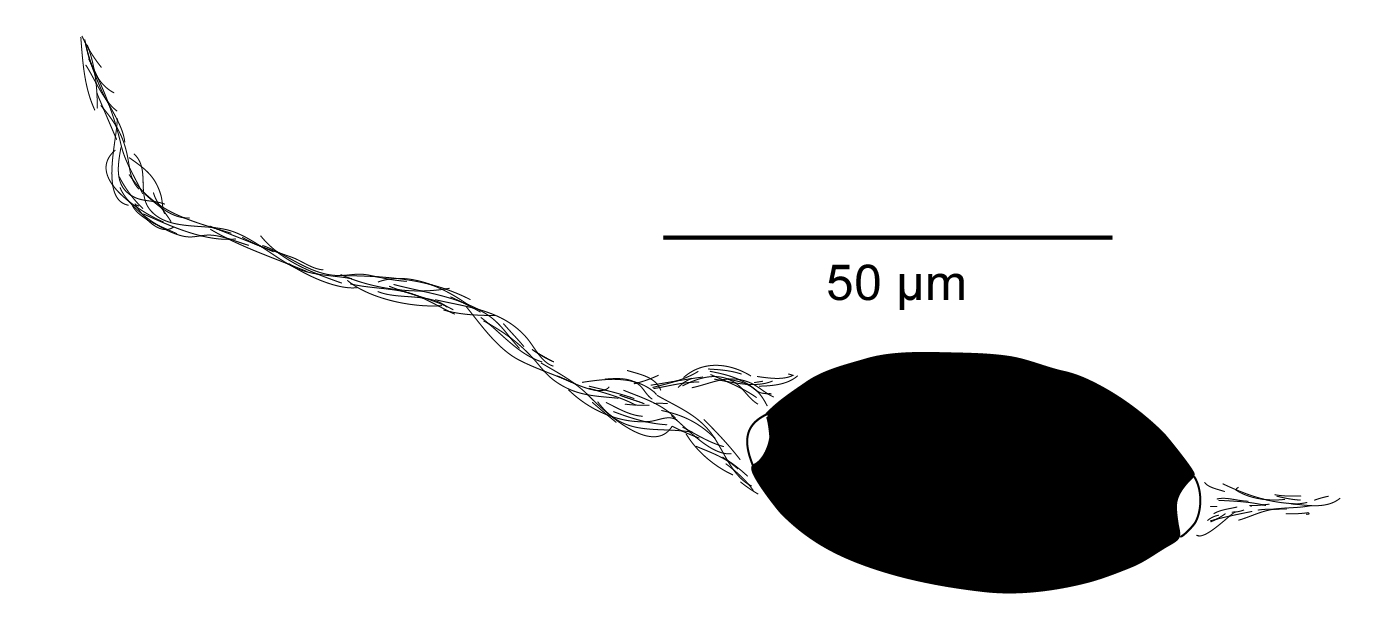
- Egg of Huffmanela filamentosa

Scientific classification
- Kingdom: Animalia
- Phylum: Nematoda
- Class: Enoplea
- Order: Trichocephalida
- Family: Trichosomoididae
- Genus: Huffmanela
- Species: H. filamentosa

Binomial name
- Huffmanela filamentosa Justine, 2004

= Huffmanela filamentosa =

Species of roundworm

Huffmanela filamentosa is a parasitic nematode It has been observed on the gills of the lethrinid fish Gymnocranius oblongus and Gymnocranius grandoculis off New Caledonia. Its eggs are released from the gill mucosa with the turnover of living tissues and immediately continue their life-cycle.

== Description ==
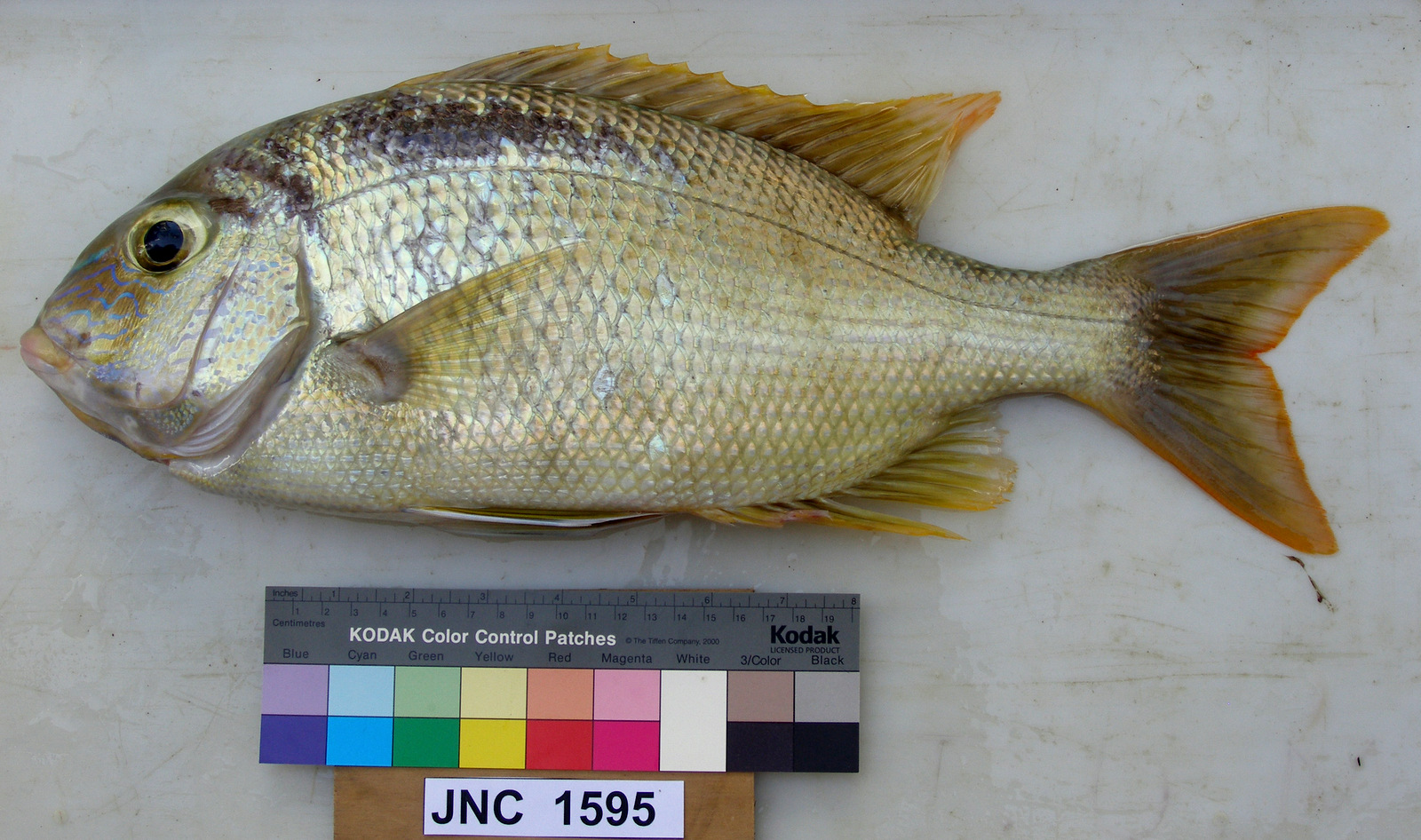
Gymnocranius oblongus, the fish host of Huffmanela filamentosa

The adults are unknown, only the eggs were described. The eggs are 48–53 micrometers in length and 25–30 micrometers in width, with thin shells. Each egg bears a few long (150 micrometers), thin filaments.

== See also ==
- Huffmanela branchialis
- Huffmanela ossicola
