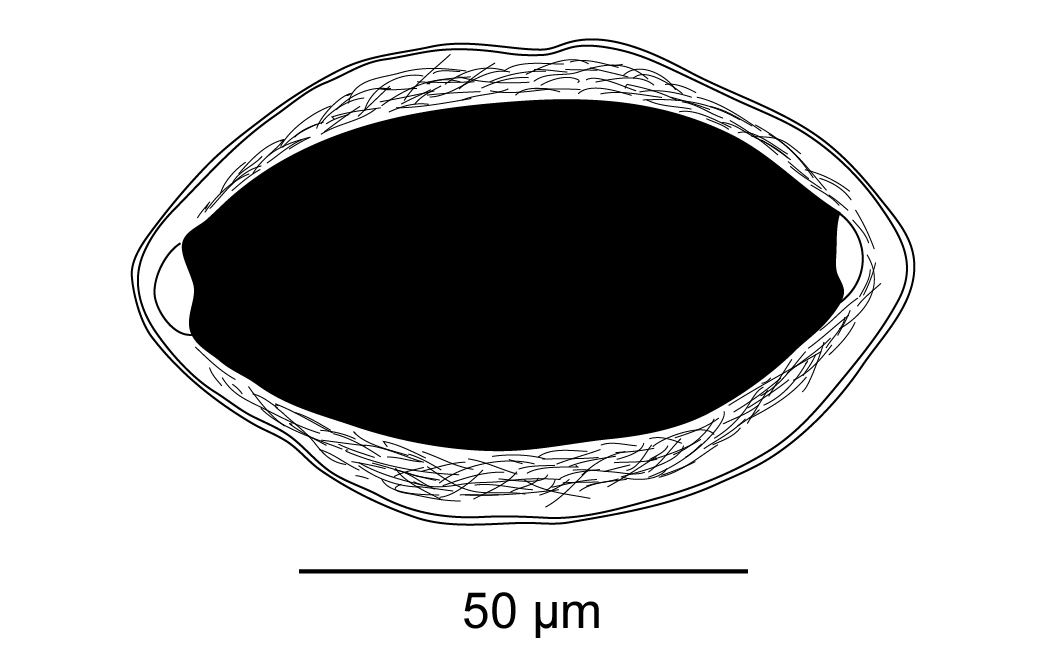
- Egg of Huffmanela ossicola

Scientific classification
- Kingdom: Animalia
- Phylum: Nematoda
- Class: Enoplea
- Order: Trichocephalida
- Family: Trichosomoididae
- Genus: Huffmanela
- Species: H. ossicola

Binomial name
- Huffmanela ossicola Justine, 2004

= Huffmanela ossicola =

Species of roundworm

Huffmanela ossicola is a parasitic nematode. It has been observed in the branchial arch bone and the spinal cord bone (as well as others) of the labrid marine fishes Bodianus loxozonus, Bodianus busellatus and Bodianus perditio caught off New Caledonia. This is the first species of Huffmanela reported from bone tissue. Its eggs are only available for the continuation of the life-cycle after the host's death.

Hosts of Huffmanela ossicola

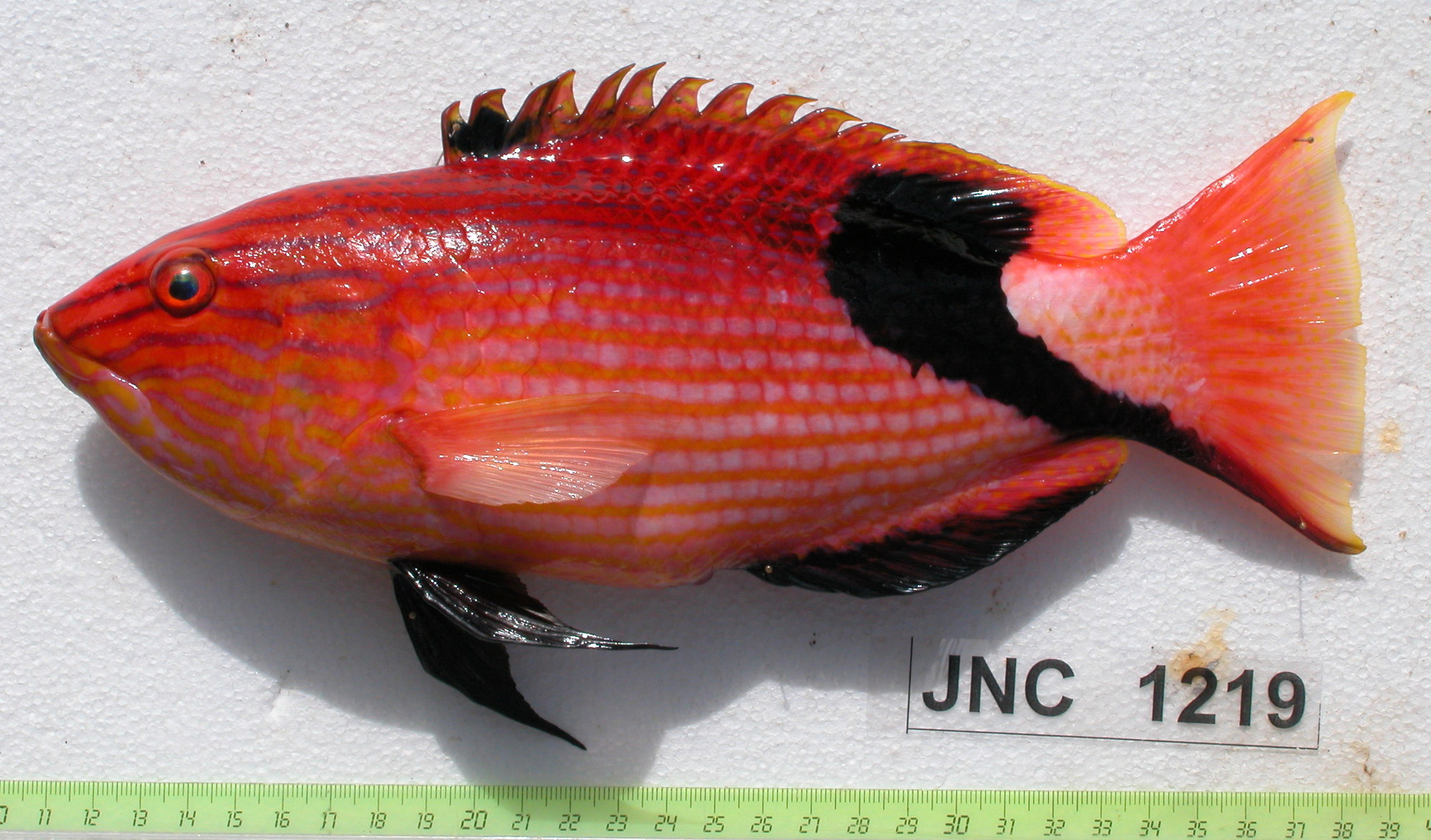
Bodianus loxozonus

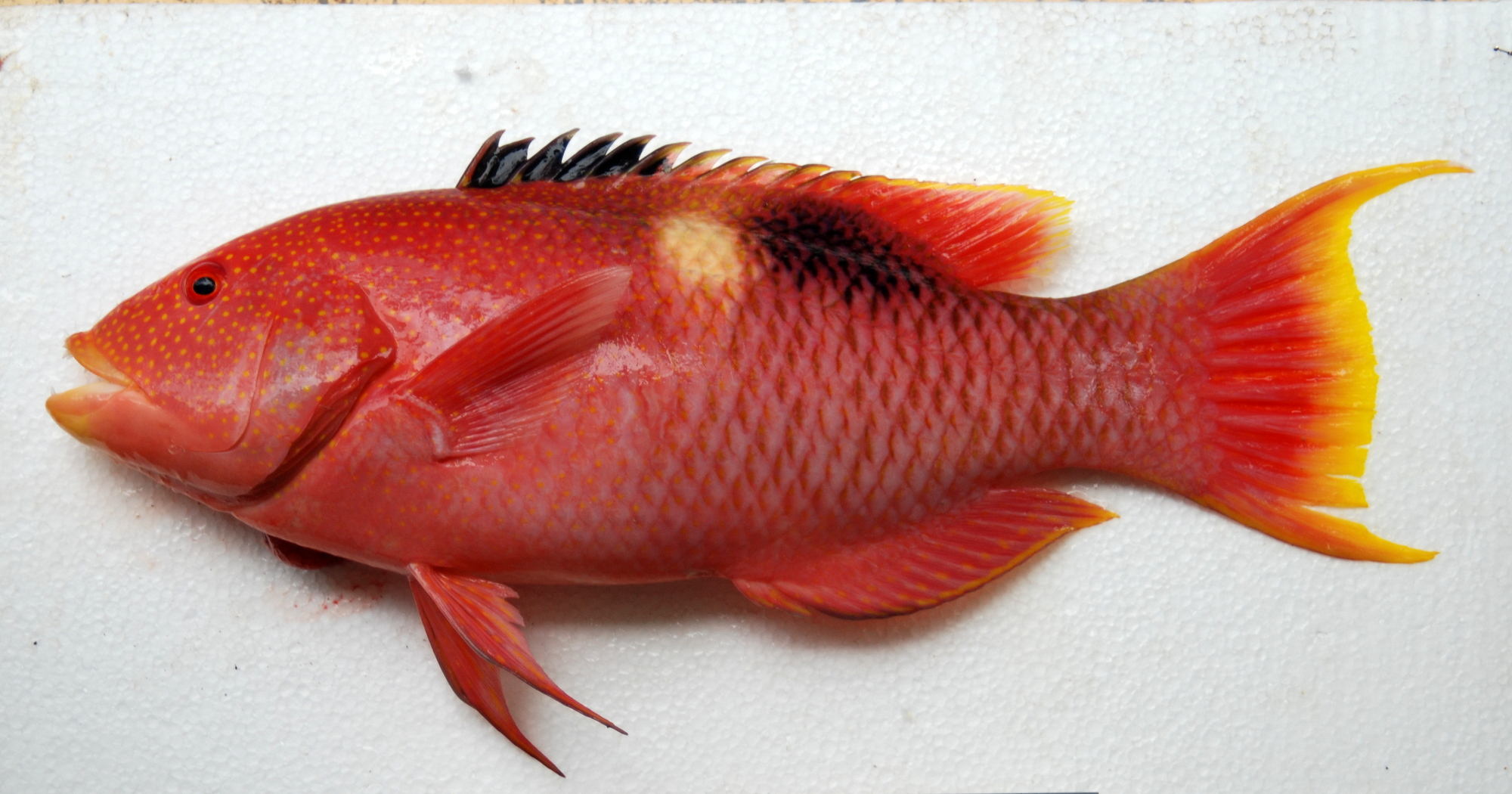
Bodianus perditio

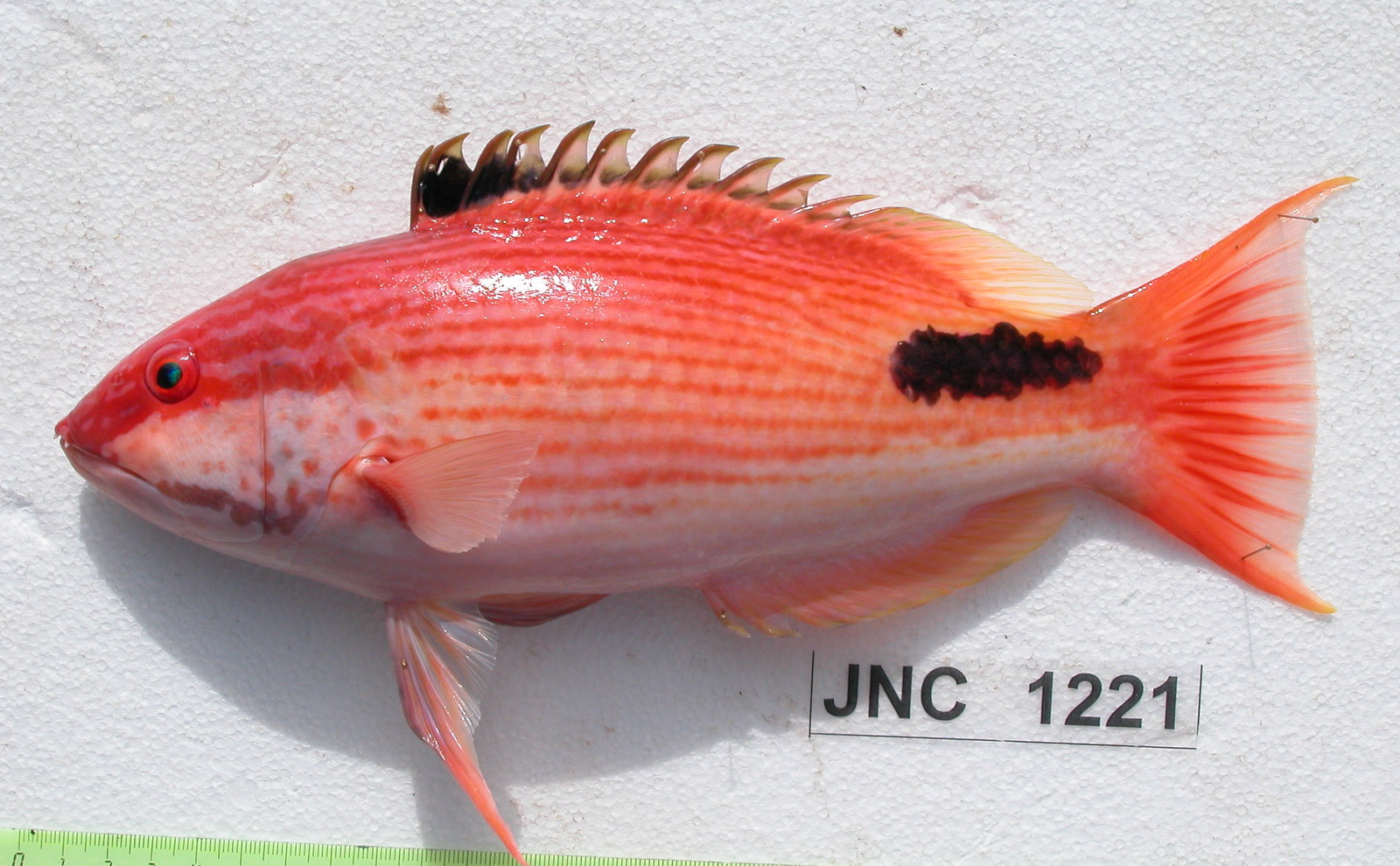
Bodianus busellatus

== Description ==
The adults are unknown; only the eggs were described. The eggs are large, 72–88 micrometers in length and 32–40 micrometers in width, with a thick shell. Each egg is covered with numerous filaments enclosed in a thin envelope.

== See also ==
- Huffmanela filamentosa
- Huffmanela branchialis
