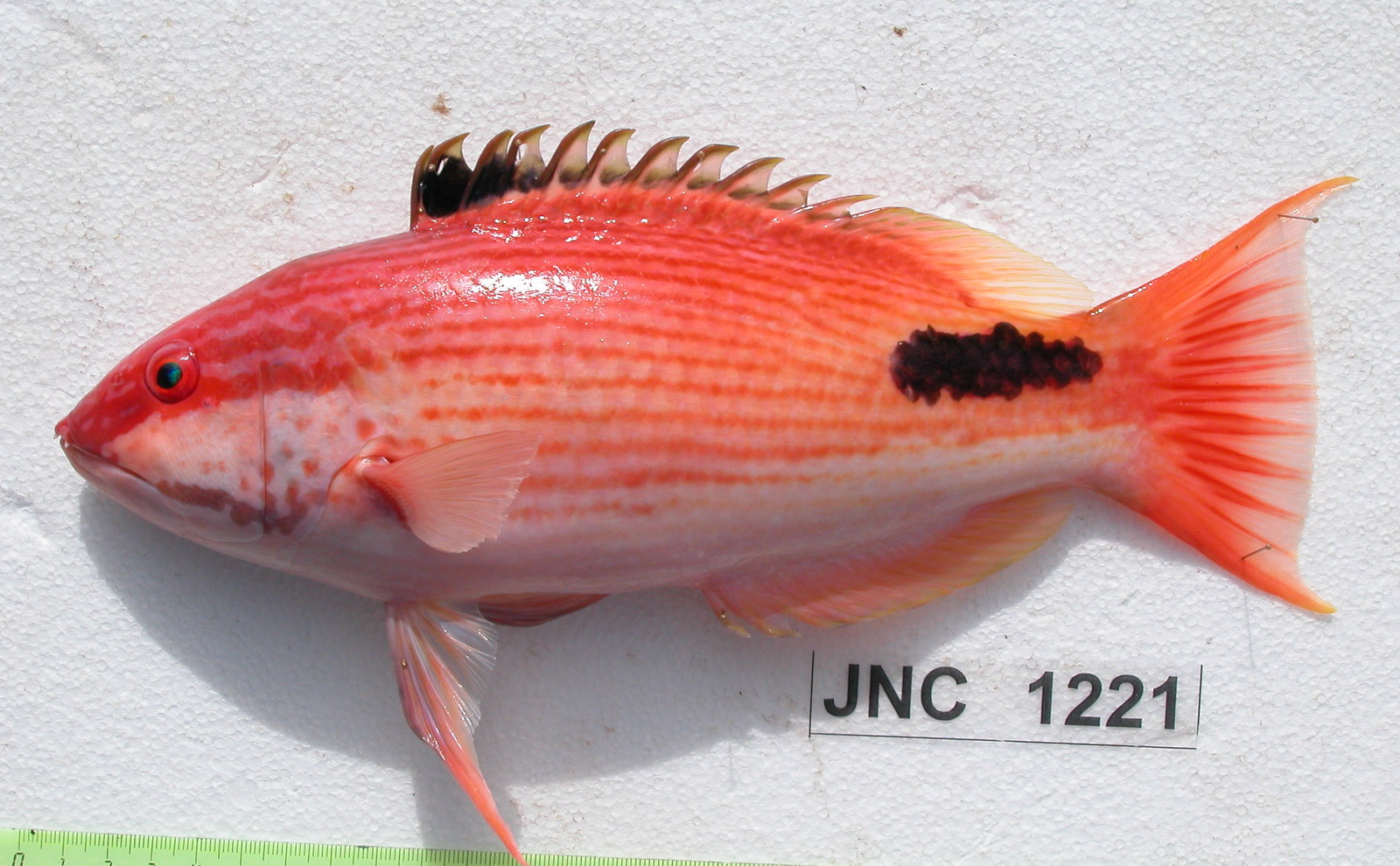

Conservation status
- Least Concern (IUCN 3.1)

Scientific classification
- Kingdom: Animalia
- Phylum: Chordata
- Class: Actinopterygii
- Order: Labriformes
- Family: Labridae
- Genus: Bodianus
- Species: B. busellatus

Binomial name
- Bodianus busellatus Gomon, 2006

= Bodianus busellatus =

Species of fish

Bodianus busellatus is a species of wrasse native to tropical and warm temperate waters of the south central Pacific, particularly the Marquesas Islands. This species was described by Martin F. Gomon of the Australian Museum in 2006 with the type locality given as northeast of Matakumu Point on Fatu Hiva in the Marquesas Islands. This species is found only in the Marquesas and Pitcairn Islands.
