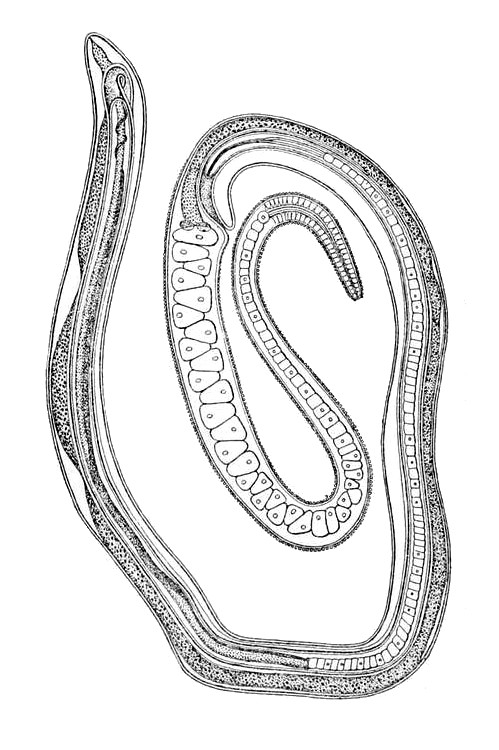
- Trichosomoides crassicauda, young female with male in vagina, drawing in Hall, 1916

Scientific classification
- Kingdom: Animalia
- Phylum: Nematoda
- Class: Enoplea
- Order: Trichocephalida
- Family: Trichosomoididae; Hall, 1916

= Trichosomoididae =

Family of roundworms

The Trichosomoididae is a family of nematodes.

== Morphological characteristics ==
The Trichosomoididae, as most nematodes, have an elongate body, vermiform and covered with a cuticle. There is often a cuticular ornamentation in form of cephalic vesicles or bosses. They are 'aphasmidian' nematodes, i.e. they have no phasmids.
The Trichosomoididae are small, with sometimes a marked sexual dimorphism, the female being larger than the male. In some cases, the male lives permanently or penetrates deeply in the female uterus. The body is slightly thicker in the posterior end.
The anterior part of the oesophagus is short, its posterior part is surrounded by glandular cells called stichocytes, arranged in chain.
The spicule and spicular sheath are absent or vestigial in the male.
The female has its vulva near the end of the oesophagus and its anus is terminal. Females are oviparous; eggs are thick-shelled, with plugs on both poles. Eggs are embryonated when laid or laid at very early stage with incompletely developed shells.

== Biology ==
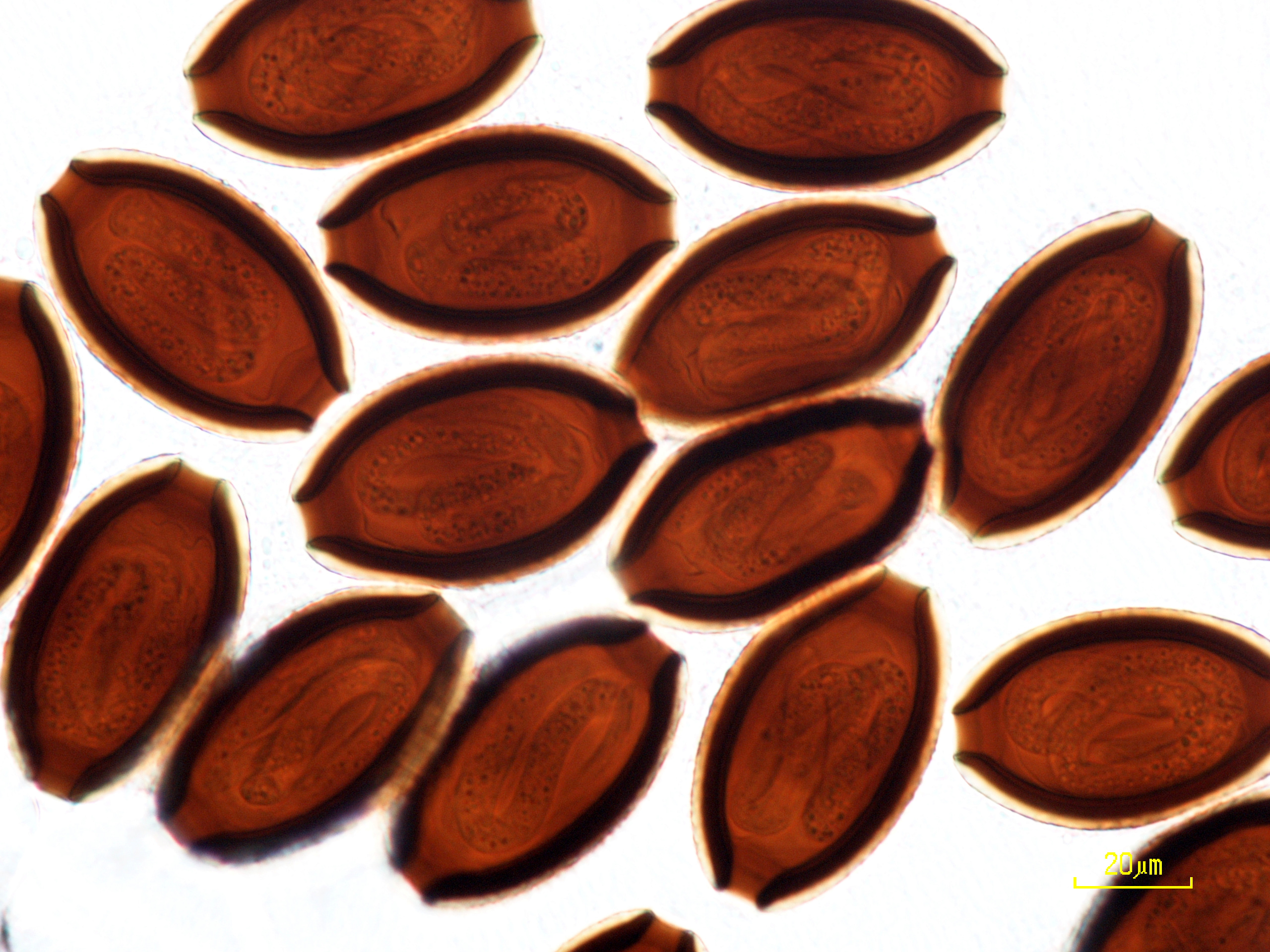
Eggs of Huffmanela hamo (Huffmanelinae), from the muscles of a fish

Nematodes of the family Trichosomoididae are all parasites of various tissues (mucosa, paracloacal glands, cornea, musculature, swimbladder wall) and even bones of fishes and mammals.

== Classification ==
According to Moravec(2001) , the family Trichosomoididae Hall, 1916 includes

- Subfamily Anatrichosomatinae Smith & Chitwood, 1954
  - Genus Anatrichosoma Smith & Chitwood, 1954
- Subfamily Huffmanelinae Moravec, 2001 (Tissue parasites of fishes)
  - Genus Huffmanela Moravec, 1987
- Subfamily Trichosomoidinae Hall, 1916
  - Genus Trichosomoides Railliet, 1895
  - Genus Trichuroides Ricci, 1949
