= Cat worm infections =

Worm infections in cats

Cat worm infections, the infection of cats (Felidae) with parasitic worms, occur frequently. Most worm species occur worldwide in both domestic and other cats, but there are regional, species and lifestyle differences in the frequency of infestation. According to the classification of the corresponding parasites in the zoological system, infections can be divided into those caused by nematode and flatworms - in the case of the latter, mainly cestoda and trematoda - while other strains are of no veterinary significance. While threadworms usually do not require an intermediate host for their reproduction, the development cycle of flatworms always proceeds via alternate hosts.

As predators, cats are the final host for most worms. As so-called endoparasites ("internal parasites"), the worms colonize various internal organs, but usually cause no or only minor symptoms of disease. The infection therefore does not necessarily have to manifest itself in a worm infection (helminthosis). For most parasites, infection can be detected by examining feces for eggs or larvae. Some worms found in cats can also be transmitted to humans and are therefore zoonotic pathogens. Of greater importance here are the feline toxocara mystax and the fox tapeworm. Especially such worm infections should be controlled by regular deworming of cats living in close contact with humans.

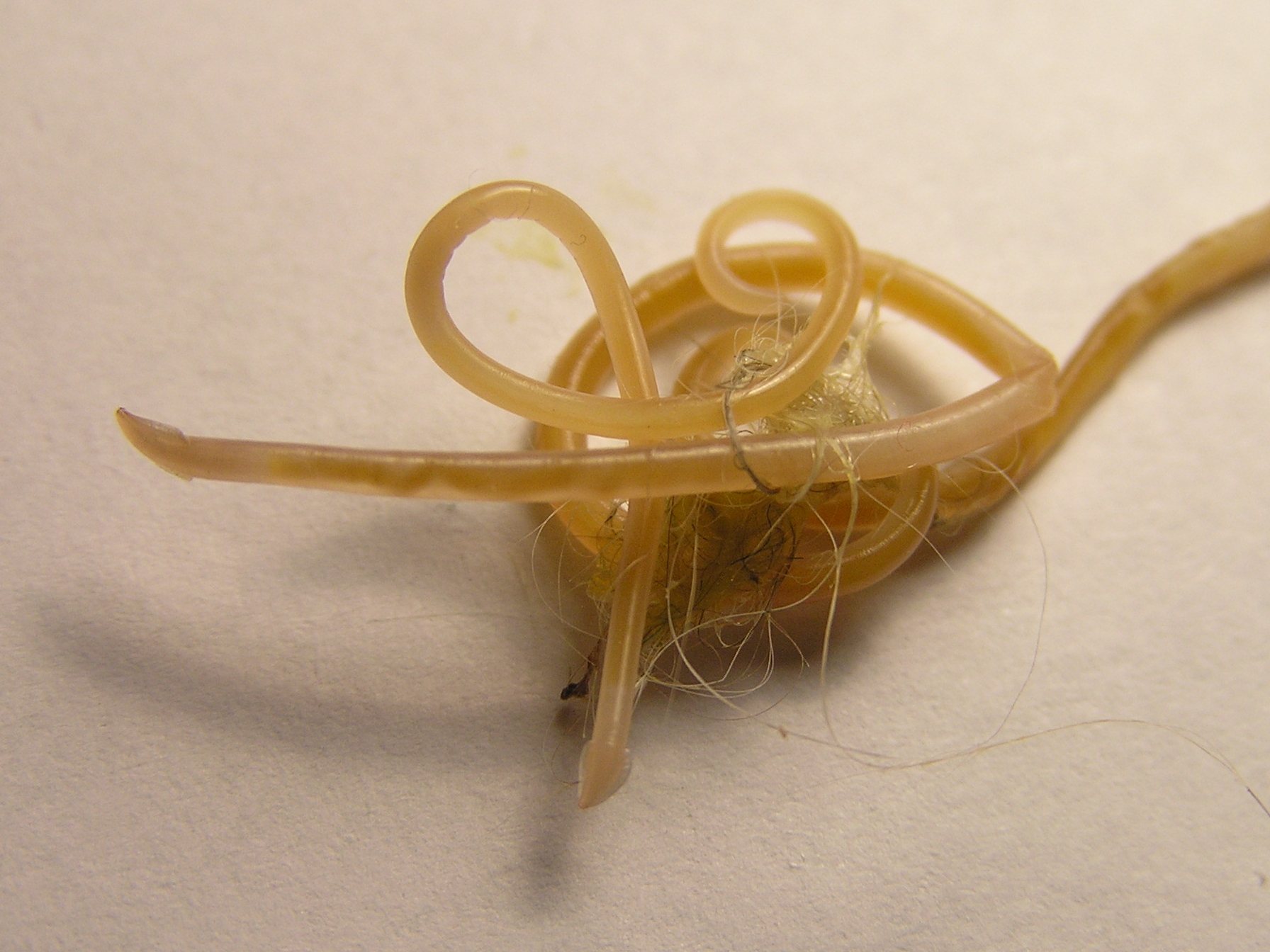
The feline roundworm, a parasite that also passes to humans.

== Threadworm infections ==
In cats, various representatives of the nematodes (Nematoda) parasitize, especially roundworms, hookworms, lungworms, hairworms and stomach worms. Co-infections by coccidia are common, especially in kittens.

=== Roundworm infestation ===
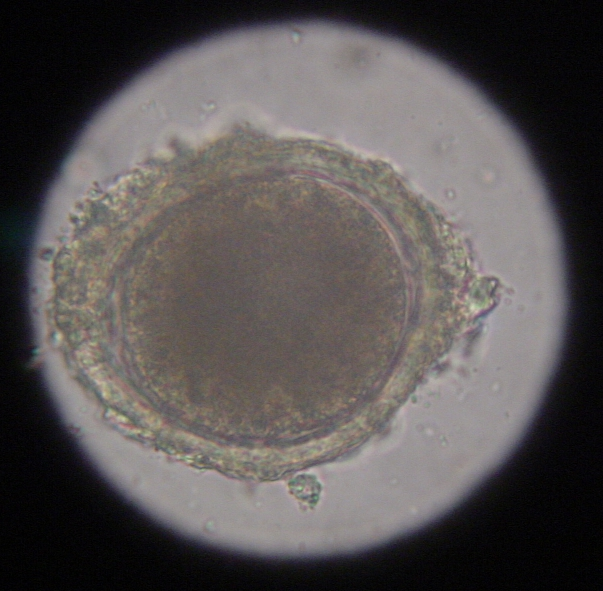
The approximately 85 μm egg of toxocara mystax in the microscopic image.

The most common roundworm in most cats is toxocara mystax (syn. toxocara cati), infestation with toxascaris leonina is less common. Only in ocelots in Texas was T. leonina detectable in every animal, making it the most common parasite, and in bobcats in Nebraska it was observed almost as often as T. mystax. Both species of roundworm occur worldwide and roundworm infestation is a very common endoparasitosis. The adult roundworms, up to 10 cm long, live in the small intestine. The female worms produce a large number of eggs, which are released into the environment with the feces. The infective larvae develop in the eggs after about four weeks.

Infection is always peroral and can occur in three ways:

- via ingestion with larvae of infected transport hosts,
- from the mother cat to her pups via the mother's milk (only with T. mystax) or
- as a filth infection by ingestion of larval eggs.

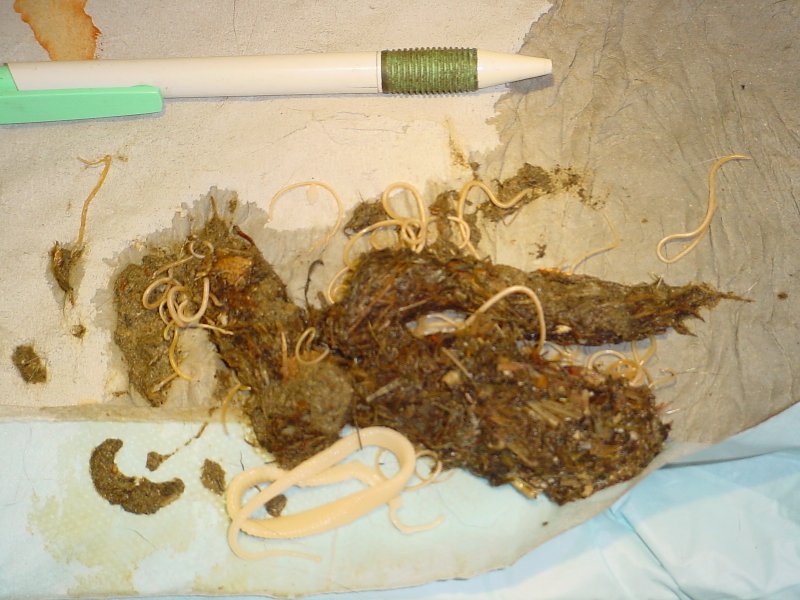
Roundworms and a cucumber nematode tapeworm in the vomit of a cat

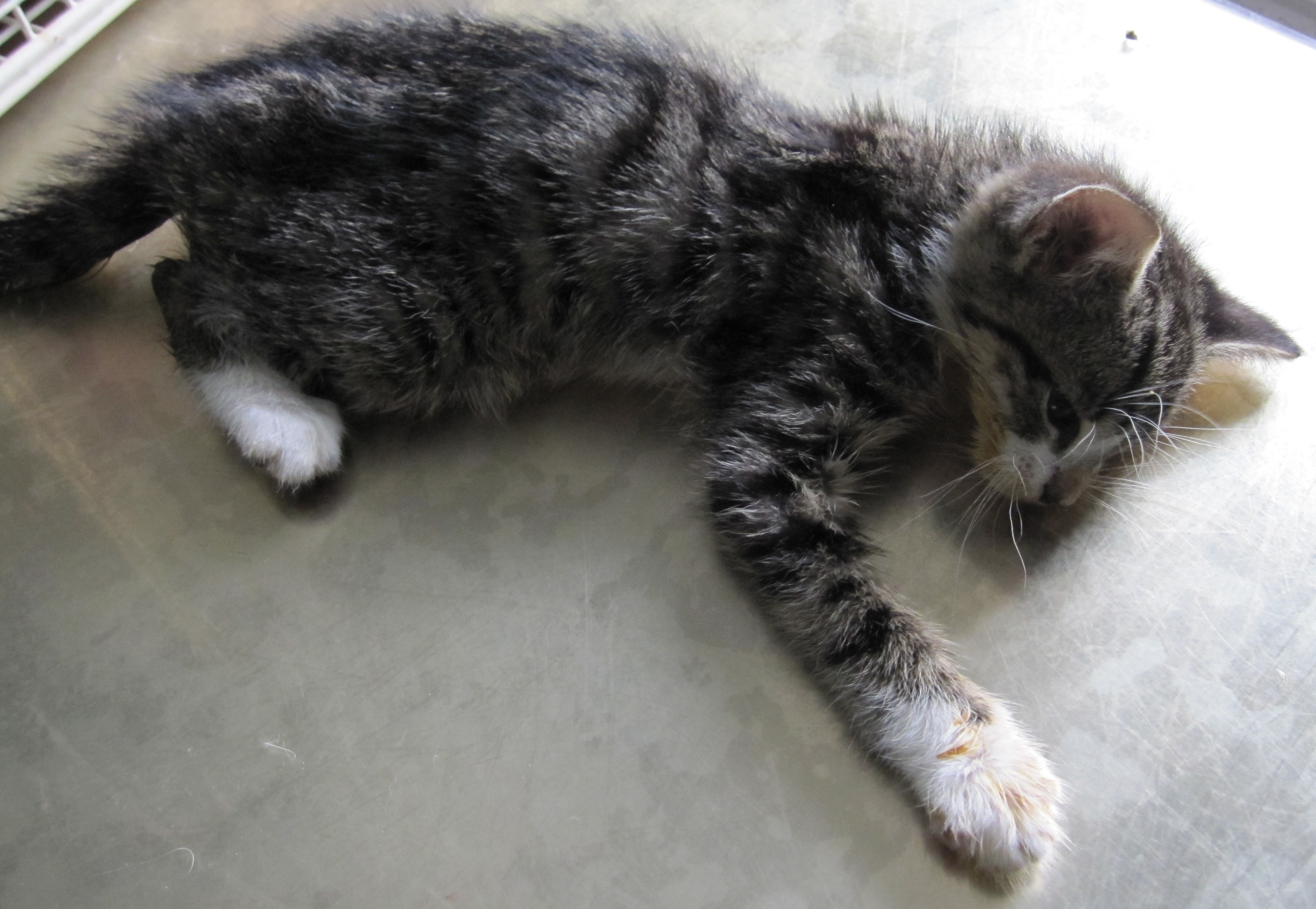
Kitten with high grade roundworm infestation

In principle, roundworms do not require intermediate hosts. Nevertheless, infection via transport hosts such as rodents is the most common route of infection in adult cats. The larvae migrate in the transport host through the intestinal wall into the muscles or internal organs. In the cat, they are released during digestion. In the case of a filth infection, the cat itself ingests larval eggs. The larvae are released in the stomach, pierce the stomach or small intestine wall, and enter the lungs via the bloodstream. From here they are coughed up and, by swallowing the sputum, re-enter the small intestine where they molt into adult worms. In T. mystax, as in the transport hosts, the larvae may also migrate via the bloodstream to other organs (including the mammary gland) where they enter a dormant stage in encapsulated nodules. The hormonally triggered mobilization of these dormant larvae in the mammary gland at the end of gestation is the basis of the third route of infection, which is the most common in kittens. The larvae excreted via the milk enter the intestine of the kittens and subsequently behave as in the case of infection via transport hosts.

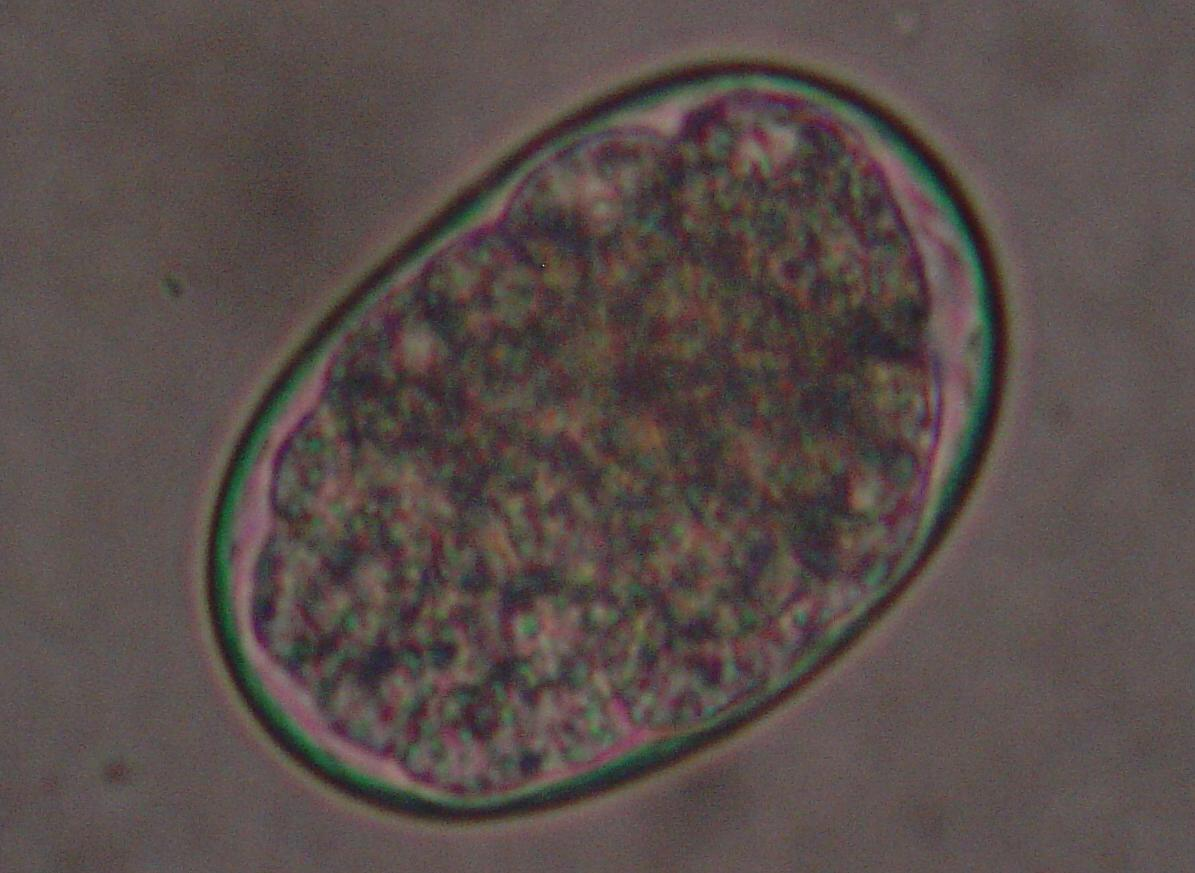
Egg from A. caninum

In general, the infestation with roundworms in cats remains asymptomatic. Only in the case of a more severe infestation - especially in kittens - unspecific symptoms such as mushy feces and, as a result of a nutrient deficiency, shaggy fur, hair loss, emaciation and dehydration occur. A massive infestation can also lead to growth disorders of the skeleton with deformation of the bones and distended joints in young animals. Very rarely, ileus occurs due to the accumulation of worms or peritonitis due to worms piercing the intestinal wall. In these cases, severe general disturbances ("acute abdomen") occur.

In the case of worms in vomit, the diagnosis can already be made without special examinations. A roundworm infestation can be detected with relative certainty by microscopic detection of the eggs extracted from the feces using the flotation method.

=== Hookworm infestation ===
Hookworms are common in cats, especially ancylostoma tubaeforme. In contrast, other hookworms such as ancylostoma caninum (main host: dogs) and uncinaria stenocephala (main host: foxes) are observed much less frequently in cats. Hookworms are up to 1.5 cm long and are small intestinal parasites. The larvae of these hookworms are either ingested by eating transport hosts (rodents) or bore through the skin of the cat (percutaneous infection).

Infection with hookworms often remains asymptomatic in cats. In more severe infestations, they can cause emaciation, anemia or diarrhea. As with roundworms, the infection is detected by detecting the eggs in the feces using a flotation method. They are oval, smaller than roundworm eggs (about 60×40 μm in size) and furrowed stages are already visible inside when the eggs are laid.

=== Gastric worm infestation (ollulanosis) ===
Gastric worms (especially ollulanus tricuspis) are up to one centimeter long and colonize the gastric mucosa, where they nestle in its mucus layer or in the openings of the gastric glands. The entire development of O. tricuspis takes place in the cat's stomach, and the larvae shed by the females develop into the adult worms within the same animal. Other animals become infected by eating vomit from infested cats.

O. tricuspis rarely causes clinical manifestations in domestic cats. A more severe infestation is manifested by occasional vomiting. Other cats, on the other hand, may show more severe clinical pictures with a reluctance to eat, emaciation and dehydration. Infection can be detected by detecting the worms in gastric lavage samples or vomit. Because O. tricuspis is viviparous (larviparous), worm eggs are not detectable in feces and larvae are only exceptionally detectable.

=== Lungworm infestation (aelurostrongylosis) ===
The lungworm aelurostrongylus abstrusus is up to one centimeter long and colonizes the lungs, more precisely the small bronchi and alveoli. Unlike the previously discussed nematodes, lungworms require an intermediate host for their development. The female worms lay eggs from which the larva L1 hatches while still in the airways. This is coughed up, swallowed and, after passing through the gastrointestinal tract, reaches the outside world via the feces. Here, the larvae are infectious in moist environments for up to six months. They penetrate various snails, which serve as intermediate hosts, and develop in them via larva L2 to larva L3. In most cases, however, cats do not become infected by eating snails, but via transport hosts such as amphibians, reptiles, birds and rodents that have previously ingested these snails. After ingestion, the larva bores through the stomach or intestinal wall of the cat and reaches the lungs via the bloodstream. The prepatency period - the time from infection to excretion of the first larvae - is about six weeks.

Lungworm infestation rarely causes symptoms of disease in cats, it is considered self-healing. Only in the case of massive infestation or disturbances of the defense system can respiratory symptoms such as coughing, difficult breathing, sneezing, eye and nasal discharge as well as a reluctance to eat, emaciation and listlessness occur. Very rarely, sudden deaths occur when particularly large numbers of larvae hatch in the airways. Lungworm infestation is established by detection of the larvae, which can be up to 400 μm long, in the faeces by means of the larval emigration method, although they are excreted irregularly in the faeces. More conclusive is detection in lung lavage samples or lung biopsies.

=== Hairworm infestation ===
Hairworms (Capillaria ssp.) are very thin, 0.7 to 8 cm long nematodes.

Hairworms are most commonly found as parasites in the gastrointestinal tract in cats, for example capillaria putorii. They are considered to cause little disease, but occasionally cause vomiting and diarrhea and, rarely, peptic ulcer disease with anemia. The eggs of gastrointestinal hairworms are oval, about 60-70 × 35-40 μm in size, and can be detected by flotation techniques.

The lung hairworm (capillaria aerophila) is widespread in wild animals such as hedgehogs or foxes, but very rare in cats. The 25 to 35 mm long worm colonizes the airways. As with roundworms and lungworms, the eggs are coughed up, swallowed and excreted in the feces. Earthworms serve as intermediate hosts, but the parasite is mostly transmitted to cats via intermediate transport hosts. The lung hairworm rarely causes symptoms of disease, only in more severe infestations bronchitis with cough occurs - mostly as a result of accompanying bacterial infections. Detection can be done by fecal examination for eggs or examination of lung lavage samples.

The urinary bladder hairworms (capillaria plica and capillaria feliscati) colonize the urinary bladder. The eggs are excreted in the urine; consequently, detection of infection is only possible from urine sediment. Urinary bladder hairworms can cause cystitis with urinary dysfunction, and in more severe infestations, anemia.

The liver hairworm (capillaria hepatica) parasitizes in the liver and can cause fatigue, vomiting, increased thirst and urination, and jaundice. Infestation can only be diagnosed on the basis of a liver biopsy followed by fine tissue examination of the tissue sample.

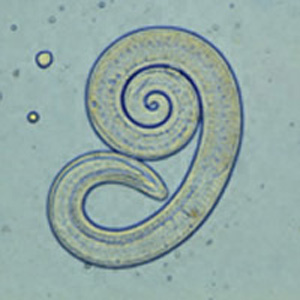
Trichinella larva

=== Trichinella infestation (trichinosis) ===
Infestation with trichinella (especially trichinella spiralis) is very rare in cats in Central Europe. Trichinae occur worldwide and have no developmental phase in the outside world. Infection occurs through ingestion of larval meat. The larvae bore into the wall of the small intestine where they develop into adult worms. The larvae released by the females enter the skeletal muscles via lymph or blood, where as a holding stage they are the source of infection for other carnivorous and omnivorous animals.

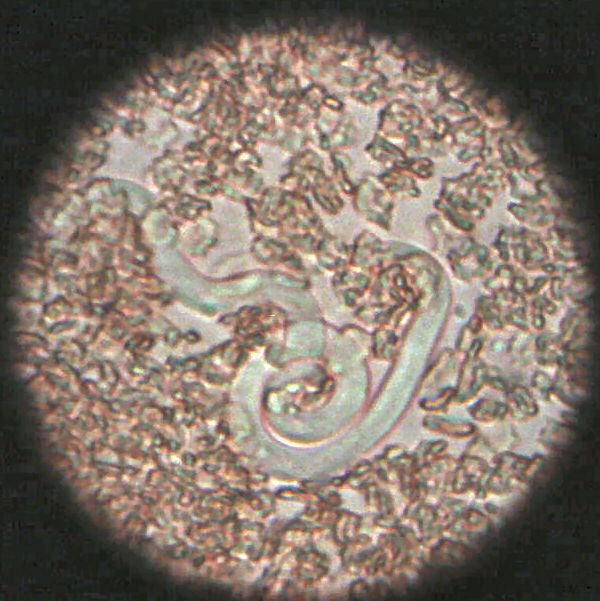
Microfilaria in blood smear

A small infestation of trichinae does not cause any symptoms in the cat. In the case of a pronounced infestation, general disturbances, vomiting and bloody diarrhea may initially occur during the intestinal colonization phase, as in humans (→ trichinosis). Rarely, however, cats develop muscle weakness, gait disturbances, respiratory problems and fever due to myositis caused by the larvae that have migrated into the muscles.

=== Heartworm infestation (dirofilariosis) ===
Infection with the up to 30 cm long heartworm (dirofilaria immitis) is rare in cats, the main host for this parasite is the dog. In Central Europe, dirofilariosis is of no significance, as the parasite is only native to the Mediterranean region and the US southern states. The disease is transmitted by biting insects, which act as obligate intermediate hosts. They ingest so-called microfilariae from the blood of infected animals during the sucking act. In the insects, development into the larva L3 takes place, which is transferred to a new host animal during another sucking act. In the subcutis, development to larva L4 takes place. This migrates via the blood vessels into the atria and large vessels near the heart and sheds its skin to become the adult heartworm. The prepatency period is 8 months.

The heartworm has a relatively high pathogenic effect on cats. The disease manifests itself in poor general condition, diarrhea and cough. It can be diagnosed by detection of the 250 μm microfilariae in the blood smear, but this is difficult in cats and thus relatively unreliable.

=== Kidney worm infestation ===
Infection with the kidney worm dioctophyma renale is only found in southern Europe, Asia and North America and is also rare in cats there, the main host being mink. The kidney worm is the largest parasitic nematode with a length of up to one meter and shows a twofold host change: first intermediate hosts are Oligochaeta, second freshwater fish. In the final host it parasitizes mainly in the renal pelvis or fat. Infestation of one kidney usually proceeds without signs of disease. If both kidneys are affected, renal dysfunction may occur as a result of hydronephrosis or pyelonephritis. The infection can be detected by kidney biopsy or imaging techniques. The barrel-shaped, yellow-brown, and 71-84 × 45-52 μm eggs only appear in urine sediment when a female and male kidney worm meet in one kidney.

== Tapeworm infections ==
In tapeworm infections, a distinction must be made between infestation with adult tapeworms and infestation with their developmental stages. The former plays by far the greater role in cats; the most common triggers are the thick-necked and the cucumber nucleus tapeworm. The harmful effect of the adult tapeworms is low; only in the case of more severe infestation can loss of appetite, emaciation and shaggy fur occur due to nutrient deprivation. The limbs migrating from the anus can cause itching and thus the so-called "sledding" (sliding on the hind end).

=== Infestation with the thick-necked tapeworm ===
The 15 to 60 cm long and about 5 mm wide taenia taeniaeformis (hydatigera or taenia taeniaeformis, also called cat tapeworm) parasitizes in the small intestine. It is a common tapeworm in cats, only exceptionally occurring in other carnivores. The shed tapeworm members leave the anus with feces or by active migration. The coated oncospheres (mature eggs with larva L1, "six-hooked larva") are released from the dried limbs in a moist environment. These can be dispersed by flies, beetles and snails. The coated oncospheres are ingested by (obligate) intermediate hosts (rodents, squirrels) and the released six-hook larva colonizes mainly the liver of the intermediate host. It gives rise to the already tapeworm-like larva (strobilocercus fasciolaris), up to 30 cm long, which is ingested when the intermediate host is eaten. Once in the small intestine, the scolex protrudes and the tapeworm attaches itself to the intestinal mucosa. The prepatency is on average five weeks.

In the same animal, usually only two to ten cat tapeworms are found, and they excrete about four to five limbs daily. These elongated trapezoidal structures may already be visible to the naked eye in the anal region. The coated oncospheres, which are about 35 μm in size, can be detected in the feces using flotation methods. In one study, an infestation rate of 25.9% was determined in autopsies, of which only 10% were detected by flotation and 27% by centrifugation. In addition, the eggs cannot be distinguished morphologically from those of other members of the taeniidae (including the fox tapeworm).

=== Infestation with the cucumber tapeworm ===
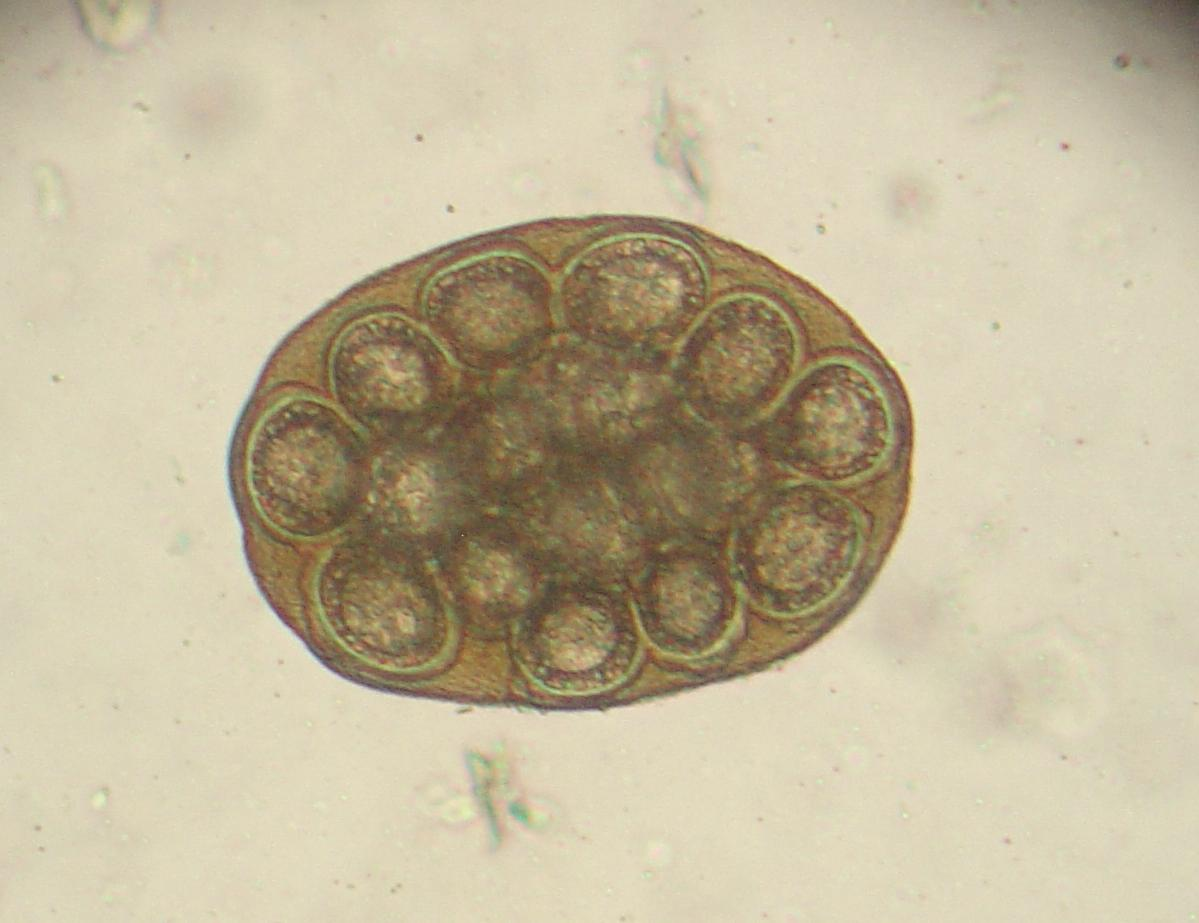
Microscopic image of an egg packet of the cucumber nematode tapeworm.

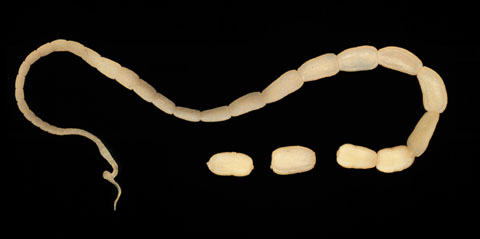
Cucumber tapeworm

The cucumber tapeworm (dipylidium caninum) - named after its limbs resembling a cucumber seed - is up to 80 cm long and parasitizes in the anterior small intestine. The obligate intermediate host is primarily the cat flea, occasionally also the cat hair flea. The tapeworm members shed in the intestine leave the anus with the feces or by active migration. The eggs are ingested by the larvae of the insects, penetrate their intestinal wall and develop in the fat body to the fin stage (cysticercoid). Depending on the external temperature, the cysticercoid is infectious as soon as the adult flea hatches or several days later. Infection occurs by eating the fleas, whereupon the fin grows into the adult tapeworm in the small intestine. The prepatency period is about three weeks.

Infestation with cucumber nematode tapeworm can be determined by detecting the limbs in the anal region or by detecting the 35-53 μm eggs or egg packets in the feces using flotation methods. However, these detection methods are very uncertain. In one study, autopsies revealed an infestation rate of 34.5%, even though all previous fecal examinations were negative.

=== Infestation with the fox tapeworm ===
Infestation with the fox tapeworm (echinococcus multilocularis) is very rare in domestic cats (0.4%), they are a secondary host - foxes act as the main host. However, since infection with this parasite is life-threatening for humans (see below), the low frequency of infestation is also of importance in terms of health policy.

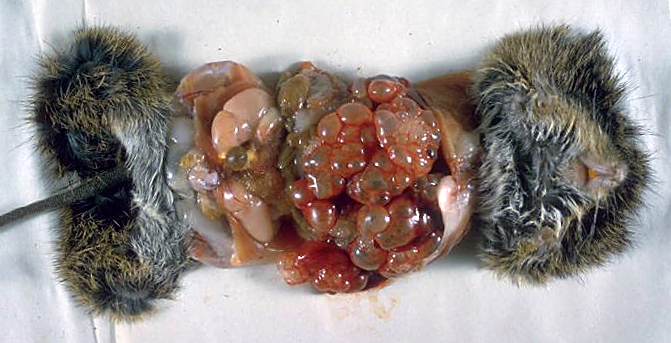
Metacestode of the fox tapeworm in a cotton rat.

The fox tapeworm, which is only about three millimeters long, is found throughout the northern hemisphere. It parasitizes in the small intestine, mostly in the posterior third, and plants itself deep between the intestinal villi. Approximately every two weeks, a tapeworm limb containing coated oncospheres is released and excreted in the feces. The coated oncospheres are very stable in the environment, even surviving freezing and most disinfectants without damage. They are only sensitive to drought, temperatures above 80 °C and sodium hypochlorite. They are ingested by intermediate hosts (mainly rodents) and develop in them within 40 to 60 days into a large, spongy tissue (metacestode) containing the infective protoscolices. Infection of the cat occurs via oral ingestion of the intermediate hosts. The prepatency period is one to four months.

In most cases, the infestation does not cause any symptoms in cats. It can be detected by means of the mobile, approximately one millimeter long limbs in the feces or the anal region as well as oncospheres already released in the intestine by means of flotation procedures. However, the latter are morphologically indistinguishable from those of the other Taeniidae. A single fecal examination has only a certainty of about 30% due to the cyclic release. Other diagnostic options include a specific ELISA for fecal samples and DNA detection by PCR. According to WHO guidelines for control of this parasite, all equipment and materials used in diagnostics must be autoclaved or incinerated.

=== Rarely occurring tapeworms ===
Infections with Taeniidae other than the thick-necked tapeworm are rare in cats. The 30 to 150 cm long taenia pisiformis (main hosts: dogs, foxes) requires lagomorphs and rodents as intermediate hosts. Cats are a less suitable final host for this tapeworm; it is usually excreted by the cat before the formation of egg-containing (gravid) limbs. Infestation with the 50 to 250 cm long taenia hydatigena (main hosts: dogs and foxes), whose intermediate hosts are pigs, ruminants and horses, and with taenia crassiceps (intermediate hosts: lagomorphs and rodents) is also rare. These representatives do not cause disease symptoms in cats. Their medical importance lies rather in the fact that their eggs are morphologically indistinguishable from those of the fox tapeworm, and that taenia hydatigena is a zoonotic agent, albeit a rare one.

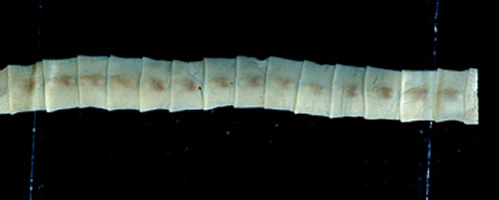
Tapeworm members of the fish tapeworm

Cats are also a less suitable final host for the fish tapeworm (diphyllobothrium latum). It grows in cats up to 1.5 m. long and 2 cm wide. The fish tapeworm requires two intermediate hosts: in the first (copepods), the procercoid, which is infectious to mammals, forms in the abdominal cavity and muscle of fish. Spirometra erinaceieuropaei, another member of the diphyllobothriidae, is very rare in Central Europe and occurs mainly in the Mediterranean region. The first intermediate host is also copepods, the second is frogs, snakes and birds.

In addition to the cucumber tapeworm, other members of the family dipylidiidae can occur in cats. However, these are mainly found in the Mediterranean region, only joyeuxiella pasqualei has now also been observed in Germany. Its intermediate hosts are dung beetles (aphodiidae), but transport hosts such as reptiles and small mammals may also be involved in the infection chain. It is up to 50 cm long. Joyeuxiella echinorhynchoides is only about half as long, and its chain of infection is the same as that of J. pasquallei. Diplopylidium noelleri and diplopylidium acanthotretum are about 12 cm long and require dung beetles or fleas as intermediate hosts.

Infestation with representatives of the genus mesocestoides is - although native to Central Europe - very rare in cats. Their first intermediate host is presumably moss mites, reptiles, birds and mammals serve as second hosts, depending on the species.

=== Infestation with fin stages ===
Fin stages are very rarely found in cats. They damage the animal by their space-occupying growth with destruction of infested organs.

The rice grain-like fin stage (tetrathyridium) of mesocestoides leptothylacus can rarely occur in cats. The actual second intermediate host is common vole. Severe infestations can result in severe disease with severe weight loss (cachexia) and deaths due to peritonitis. Due to the coenurus of taenia serialis as well as the cysticercus of taenia crassiceps central nervous disorders (similar to coenurosis of sheep) have been observed as a result of damage to the brain.

Other feline fin stages are the metacestode of the three-limbed dog tapeworm (echinococcus granulosus), the sparganum of spirometra mansonoides and the cysticercus of the pork tapeworm (taenia solium). In most cases, however, they do not cause any symptoms of disease, but are discovered as incidental findings during autopsies.

== Sucking worm infections ==
Infections by fluke (Trematoda) are rare in Central Europe and generally run without signs of disease. They are detectable by the detection of the eggs in the feces.

=== Liver fluke infestation ===
Liver flukes (opisthorchis felineus, pseudoamphistomum truncatum and metorchis bilis), which occur in cats, require a twofold change of host for their development. Water snails serve as the first intermediate host, and freshwater fish serve as the second. Cats become infected by ingesting fish. The encapsulated (encystosed) metacercariae in fish are very resistant and are safely killed only by cooking. In rare cases, infestation with liver fluke can cause intestinal inflammation with diarrhea, disturbed general condition, and liver and pancreas changes.

=== Intestinal fluke infestation ===
Various intestinal flukes occur in cats and, as with liver flukes, their development occurs via two intermediate hosts. The first intermediate host is always a freshwater snail. The second intermediate host - and thus the source of infection for cats - varies according to the parasite species: in the case of alaria alata it is tadpoles, reptiles, birds and mammals, in the case of metagonimus yokogawai and apophallus donicus fish, in the case of isthmiophora melis fish and amphibians, and in the case of echinochasmus perforans tadpoles and fish. Intestinal fluke infestation rarely causes disease symptoms such as diarrhea.

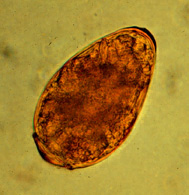
Egg from P. westermani

=== Lung fluke infestation ===
Lung flukes (in Asia mainly paragonimus westermani, in America mainly P. kellicotti) play no role in Europe. The first intermediate host is aquatic snails, the second freshwater crabs and crayfish. Infection occurs by ingestion of raw shellfish. Lung flukes have been found quite frequently in tigers and leopards in Thailand, but not in Bengal cats. In America, they occur in both domestic cats and wild animals. Metacercariae released in the intestine migrate to the lungs, where they develop into adult flukes in cysts. As with the other lungworms, the eggs are coughed up and enter the environment in the feces.

Infestation with lung flukes may remain asymptomatic, but may also cause respiratory problems similar to those of feline asthma. Bursting of the cysts can cause pneumothorax with acute respiratory distress. Detection of infection can be done by fecal examination for eggs, by bronchoalveolar lavage, or by radiography of the lungs.

== Infestation frequency and its influencing factors ==
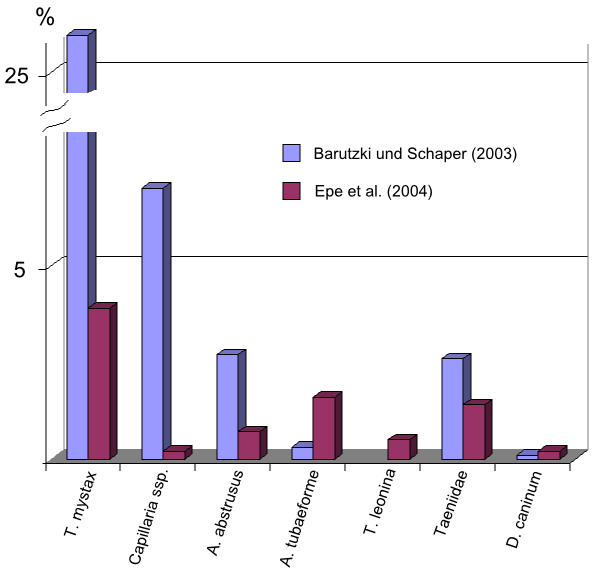
Infestation frequency with worms in domestic cats in Germany

The frequency of infestation varies greatly depending on the worm species. In a German study of 3167 domestic cats, endoparasites were detected by flotation in 24% of the animals, with T. mystax showing the highest infestation rate at 26%. Another study of 441 fecal samples detected T. mystax in only 3.9% of the samples, but again this roundworm was the most common parasite. Infestation with T. mystax also dominates in Belgium, the Netherlands, the United Kingdom, the United States, Australia, and Nigeria, where infestation rates are as high as 60%. In Qatar, on the other hand, tapeworms (T. taeniaeformis: 76%, dipylidiidae: 43%) were mainly observed in stray cats, and T. mystax in only 0.4% of the animals.

There are numerous factors influencing worm infestation. As a rule, wild animals are much more frequently affected than cats in human care, since the latter are often dewormed regularly. In domestic cats, there are also significant differences between indoor-only cats and those with outdoor access or strays, as rodents or fish are more frequently ingested by the latter, which represent a source of infection as intermediate or transport hosts. In addition, feral and domestic cats occasionally eat vomit from other cats due to hunger, so that stomach worm infestation is much more common in them. Stray cats in Spain showed nearly 90% infestation with gastrointestinal worms. Cats in larger populations, such as animal shelters or laboratory holdings, are much more likely to be affected due to closer contact with potential worm carriers. Fecal examinations of big cats and other feral cats showed evidence of worm eggs or larvae in 66 to 100% of animals, depending on the species.

In addition to globally occurring parasites such as T. mystax, some have a restricted range. This may be due to geographical or climatic conditions and the presence of suitable intermediate hosts. For example, the cat liver fluke (opisthorchis felineus) is more common in Asia and southern and eastern Europe; in Germany, it is most common in eastern Brandenburg, where an infestation frequency of 16% has been determined. The fish tapeworm occurs in Germany primarily along major rivers and in coastal regions, and in Switzerland in the large lakes. Most dipylidiidae are found exclusively in southern Europe.

== Diagnostics ==
There are hardly any reliable data on the actual infestation rates in the total populations of the different cat species. Clinically, only very few worm infections - for example, the presence of roundworms in vomit or tapeworm members in the anal region - can be detected.

For most cat species, there are no studies at all or, at best, individual studies on regionally restricted populations. Most studies are based on fecal examinations in domestic cats. However, a number of worm infections cannot be detected with this examination method or the detection is only uncertain due to cyclic shedding as in the case of fox and cucumber nematode tapeworm. If necessary, microscopic methods must be supplemented by elaborate molecular biological methods, for example, to distinguish eggs of the Taeniidae from each other.

The few surveys based on autopsies are not based on random sampling, but on material sent in from deceased animals. Especially for infestation with fin stages of tapeworms, autopsy is the only reliable detection method - except for a few complex imaging procedures.

Suitable test material for the detection of worm infections
Material	Parasit
Feces (flotation)	roundworms, hookworms, gastrointestinal hairworms adult tapeworms liver, lung and intestinal flukes
Feces (emigration)	Lungworms
Stomach contents	Stomach worms
Tissue samples	Trichinae (muscle) Liver hairworm (liver) Kidney worm (kidney)
Blood	Heartworm
Urine	Urinary bladder hair worms Kidney worm

== Combat ==
Complete elimination of worm infections in cats is impossible. The development cycles of the parasites cannot be stopped, since new generations of parasites are constantly growing via free-living cats or other hosts. Also the control of possible intermediate hosts is hardly practicable and ecologically not justifiable. The harmless disposal of cat feces is a hygienic measure that at least leads to pathogen dilution. Feces should be collected daily and disposed of with household waste, because roundworm eggs are infectious in moist environments for up to four years, whipworm eggs for over six years, and tapeworm eggs for six months. The eggs have a high tenacity. Floors can be effectively cleaned with a steam cleaner at over 60 °C, litter trays with boiling water. Care should be taken to ensure good subsequent drying. Most disinfectants are not effective against nematode eggs, including hand sanitizers, so gloves should be worn when handling feces.

Treatment of worm infections is mostly limited to cats kept in human care. Most infections are rather harmless for cats, since a pathogen-host balance is established when the immune system is intact. However, because some of them can cause health disorders and some also pose a potential danger to humans, regular deworming for cats in the human environment are quite reasonable. The European Scientific Counsel Companion Animal Parasites (ESCCAP) - the European Association of Pet Parasite Professionals - has therefore issued recommendations for the control of worm infections. These are adapted to regional specifics by national veterinary societies. In the United States, there are also such guidelines, issued here by the Companion Animal Parasite Council (CAPC).

The recommendations, which were last adapted for Germany in July 2014 according to the ESCCAP guidelines, aim to protect cats "(...) from infections with worms and their consequences through professional diagnostics, medication and prevention." Targeted control is recommended primarily for roundworms, hookworms and tapeworms. In Germany, heartworm control only plays a role for those cats (and dogs) that are to be moved to or originate from endemic foreign countries (including southern and eastern European countries).

=== Roundworms (Toxocara spp.) ===
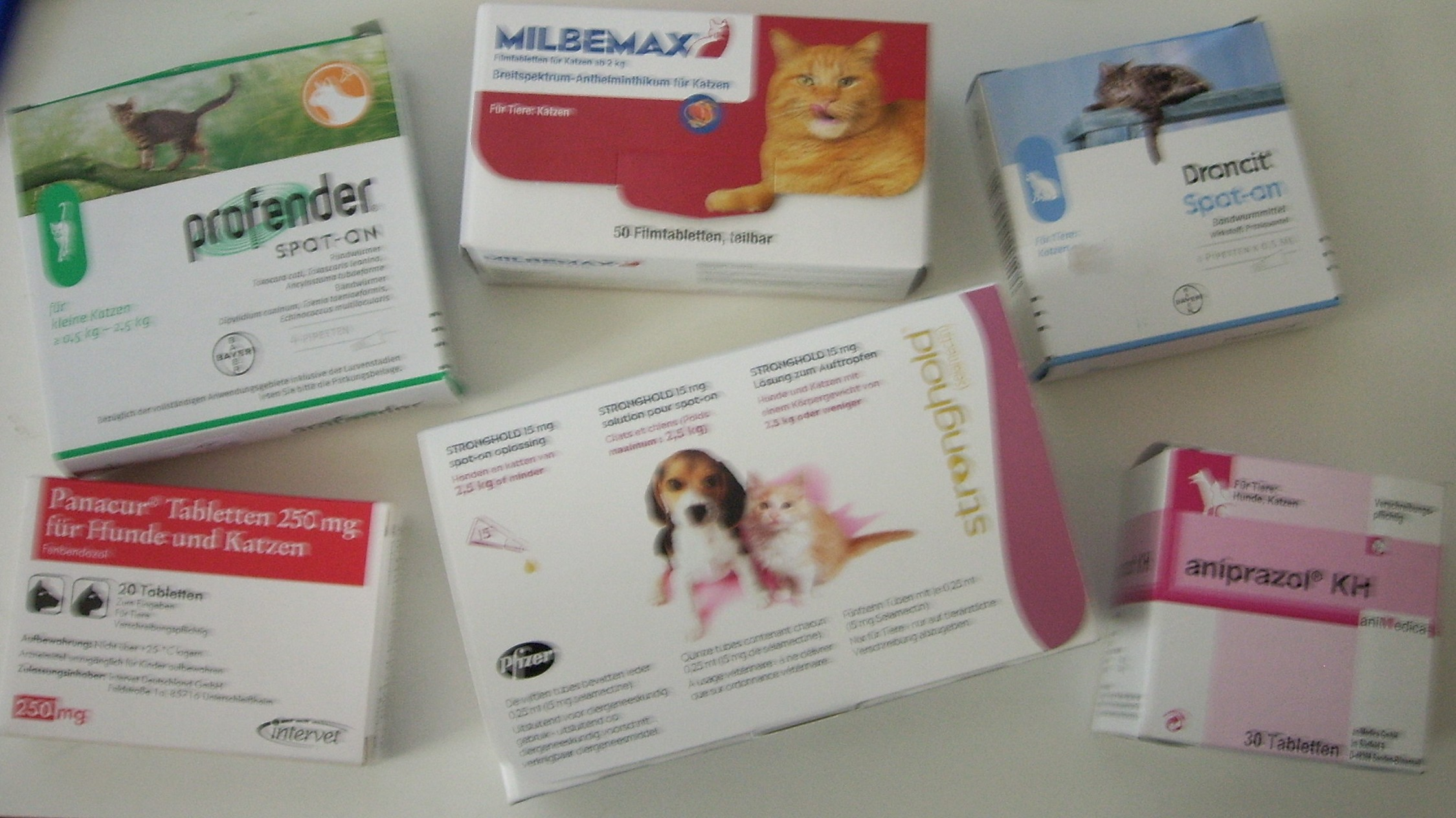
Some anthelmintics for cats

Kittens should be treated against roundworms with a suitable worming agent (anthelmintic) starting at the age of three weeks and then at two-week intervals until two weeks after weaning. The nursing mother cat should also be dewormed at the same time as the kittens are first treated. Reliable protection against the transmission of roundworms can only be provided by monthly treatment, which should be considered, for example, for cats in larger enclosures, for cats with regular unsupervised exercise and for cats with close contact in families with young children. In general, however, an individual risk assessment should be performed for each animal - if the risk of infection is unknown or if infections cannot be ruled out by diagnostic testing, at least quarterly deworming is suggested.

For treatment against roundworms, drugs based on emodepsid, eprinomectin, fenbendazole, flubendazole, mebendazole, milbemycinoxime, moxidectin, pyrantel and selamectin are approved in Germany for domestic cats. Emodepside, eprinomectin, and selamectin may be used in pregnant and lactating cats.

=== Other nematodes ===
The drugs are broad-spectrum anthelmintics and also exert an effect against most other nematodes found in cats, but this effect may be absent or insufficient in individual cases. For protection against heartworms (D. immitis), of the substances only eprinomectin, moxidectin, milbemycinoxime and selamectin are effective. Gastric worms (O. tricuspis) are not covered by any of these active substances; here, no preparations approved for cats are on the market in Germany, so that other veterinary drugs based on levamisole or ivermectin have to be repurposed. In the case of kidney worm infestation (D. renale), only removal of the affected kidney is possible.

=== Tapeworms ===
Against an infestation with the cucumber seed tapeworm (D. caninum), the active ingredient praziquantel is mainly used in cats, against species of the genus Taenia additionally fenbendazole. Since the cucumber seed tapeworm can be transmitted by fleas, deworming should always be considered if the cat has a flea infestation.

For the control of the fox tapeworm (E. multilocularis), which is native to the whole of Central and Eastern Europe - although cats are only of minor importance for its spread - it is recommended not to feed raw meat or slaughterhouse waste. For outdoor cats or cats that hunt rodents, regular fecal examinations or monthly treatment against tapeworms is indicated. It is important that every occurrence of morphologically identical tapeworm eggs (Taeniidae) should be diagnostically clarified in a special laboratory. In case of a positive detection, rigid hygienic measures such as bathing under protective clothing and strict harmless disposal of feces must be taken. For the treatment of fox tapeworm, mainly praziquantel is used. Some European countries such as the United Kingdom, Ireland, Malta, Finland, Sweden or Norway require a treatment against fox tapeworm documented in the EU pet passport as a prerequisite for entry.

== Dangers for humans ==
Some of the worms found in cats are transmissible to humans, in other words, zoonotic agents.

The greatest danger to humans is posed by the fox tapeworm (E. multilocularis). It causes the clinical picture of alveolar echinococcosis, which is characterized by small-bubble destruction of internal organs - affecting the liver in >99.9% - and is usually fatal if left untreated. However, this disease is very rare, and cats, since the tapeworm is rarely found in them, do not play a role in the spread of this parasite according to most authors. However, in an Austrian study of 21 patients, ownership of cats was shown to be a risk factor for this disease.

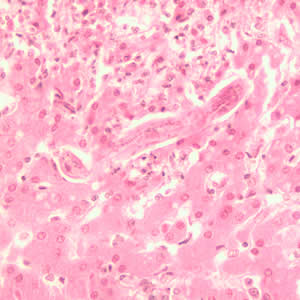
Toxocara larva in the liver of a human being

Of the roundworms, toxocara mystax is transmissible to humans as a smear infection. The most common source of infection for small children is sandboxes contaminated with cat feces. The infection corresponds to that of a transport host and - in contrast to infection with the dog roundworm - is usually clinically inconspicuous. In humans, the larvae can also migrate to internal organs or the muscles (so-called larva migrans visceralis). Occasionally, such migrating larvae can cause eye damage, central nervous phenomena (headache, behavioral disorders), liver enlargement, bronchitis with cough, or, in children, allergic reactions such as hives. Nematodes such as A. caninum, C. hepatica and the kidney worm, which are rather rare in cats, can also infect internal organs of humans as migratory larvae. Cats do not play a role in the spread of trichinosis because trichinae are rare in them and cats are not normally eaten by humans.

The cat liver fluke can rarely cause disease in children if they swallow infected fleas, usually accidentally (→ dipylidiasis). Here, humans, like cats, act as the final host; direct infection from a cat is not possible. In addition, the domestic dog plays by far the greater role in the spread of this tapeworm. The other representatives of the Dipylidiidae are also zoonotic agents.

In rare cases, the cat liver fluke can also be transmitted to humans. However, infection does not occur through cats, but through ingestion of fish containing metacercariae. In addition to cats, otters and foxes play a role in maintaining the parasite population as definitive hosts. Intestinal flukes are also pathogenic to humans, but cats play little role in the spread of these parasites; in the case of alaria alata, infection is mostly via pork (pigs act as transport hosts). The same applies to the spread of lung flukes such as paragonimus westermani - humans become infected by ingesting raw shellfish.

To protect against zoonotic worm infections, ESCCAP recommends:

- Hygiene measures such as washing hands or gardening with gloves,
- no consumption of unwashed plants (vegetables, fruits and mushrooms),
- regular parasitological examinations and/or deworming of the cats,
- regular removal of cat feces (but this is not practical for outdoor and feral cats), and
- Avoiding environments potentially contaminated with worm stages (dog runs, gardens or playgrounds, sandboxes), especially for children.
