= Aonchotheca forresteri =

Scientific classification
- Domain: Eukaryota
- Kingdom: Animalia
- Phylum: Nematoda
- Class: Enoplea
- Order: Enoplida
- Family: Capillariidae
- Genus: Aonchotheca
- Species: A. forresteri

Binomial name
- Aonchotheca forresteri (Kinsella and Pence, 1987)

Synonyms
- Capillaria forresteri Kinsella and Pence, 1987; Aonchotheca forresteri: Pisanu and Bain, 2004

Species of roundworm

Aonchotheca forresteri is a parasitic nematode that infects the marsh rice rat (Oryzomys palustris) in Florida. Occurring mainly in adults, it inhabits the stomach. It is much more common during the wet season, perhaps because its unknown intermediate host is an earthworm that only emerges when it rains. The worm was discovered in 1970 and formally described in 1987. Originally classified in the genus Capillaria, it was reclassified in Aonchotheca in 1999. A. forresteri is small and narrow-bodied, with a length of 13.8 to 19.4 mm in females and 6.8 to 9.2 mm in males. Similar species such as A. putorii differ in features of the alae and spicule (organs in the male), the size of the female, and the texture of the eggs.

== Taxonomy ==
Aonchotheca forresteri was discovered during a survey of the endoparasites of Florida marsh rice rats (Oryzomys palustris) by John Kinsella from 1970 to 1972, and is one of several new parasite species in this study, which was done because there were no previous comprehensive studies of the endoparasites of the species. Together with Danny Pence, Kinsella described the worm in a 1987 paper as Capillaria forresteri; the specific name honors Donald J. Forrester of the College of Veterinary Medicine, University of Florida. Kinsella and Pence described it as one of many species of Capillaria, a large and taxonomically difficult genus. They suggested that it may be closest to some other small species that live in the digestive systems of mammals, such as the very similar C. putorii, which is found in a variety of carnivorans in North America and Europe. In 1982, Moravec had placed Capillaria putorii and a number of related species in a separate genus, Aonchotheca, and in 1999 Pisanu and Bain transferred Capillaria forresteri and various other species to that genus from Capillaria. Thus, the species is now known as Aonchotheca forresteri.

== Description ==
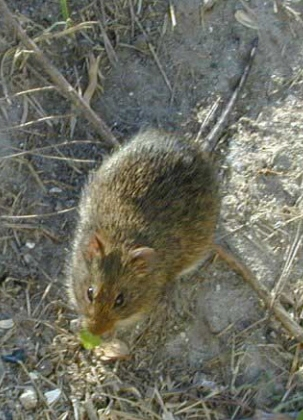
The marsh rice rat (here in Paynes Prairie, Florida, the type locality of A. forresteri), is the only known host of Aonchotheca forresteri.

Aonchotheca forresteri is a small, narrow-bodied worm. It is narrowest at the front and increases in width to about three fourths of its length. The cuticle, the surface layer, is smooth. Females are 13.8 to 19.4 mm long, averaging 16.9 mm, which makes them substantially longer than female A. putorii, and 55 to 70 (average 62) μm wide. The eggs are smooth, lacking the elaborate pattern on the surface seen in A. putorii, and are 53 to 58 (54) μm long and 21 to 24 (21) μm broad. The esophagus, the frontmost part of the digestive system, is 2.9 to 3.9 (3.6) mm long and is lined by 36 to 45 (40) cells known as stichocytes. The vulva is located 66 to 105 (83) μm behind the end of the esophagus and the anus is near the end of the worm, which is rounded.

At 6.8 to 9.2 (7.7) mm, males are only about half as long as females. Their maximum width is 34 to 42 (37) μm. The length of the esophagus is 2.3 to 3.0 (2.6) mm, of which the muscular pharynx makes up 260 to 315 (273) μm, and is lined by 35 to 42 (37) stichocytes. The back region of the worm is 4.5 to 6.2 (5.1) mm long. The back, or rectal, opening of the digestive tube is located near the end of the worm, and the length of the cloaca is 530 to 576 (550) μm. Near the back end, there are two alae (ridges) at the sides (laterally), which are 40 to 55 (46) μm long; these are located at 10 to 15 μm from another, small ala at the tip. In A. putorii, the lateral alae are much longer and reach the ala at the tip. The spicule, a spikelike structure that functions in reproduction, is curved at the tip and hardened and has a length of 380 to 426 (406) μm. It is smaller than that of the similar A. tamiasstriati from North American chipmunks and larger than that of A. murissylvatici from various North American and European small rodents, but about as long as that of A. putorii, which however lacks the curved tip.

== Distribution and ecology ==
Marsh rice rats from Paynes Prairie, Alachua County; Cedar Key, Levy County; and Lake Istokpoga, Highlands County, all in Florida, have yielded A. forresteri. In Paynes Prairie, the type locality, 82 of 178 animals examined were infected with 1 to 50 (average 10) worms, but in Cedar Key only a single rat contained one worm. The worms were found in the front part, or fundus, of the stomach, with their front ends in the fundal tissue and their back ends projecting into the inside.

In Paynes Prairie, there was no significant difference in rate of infection between males and females, but only 4% of juveniles were infected, compared to 52% of adults. Most species of Capillaria occur in multiple hosts, but A. forresteri has been found only in the marsh rice rat, even though several other small mammals (the round-tailed muskrat, Neofiber alleni; cotton mouse, Peromyscus gossypinus; hispid cotton rat, Sigmodon hispidus; and marsh rabbit, Sylvilagus palustris) occur in Paynes Prairie. The rice rat eats more animal food than any of those, and perhaps A. forresteri has an intermediate host that is not eaten by the other species. A. forresteri is markedly more prevalent in the wet season (spring) than the dry season (autumn), perhaps because rainfall patterns influence the habits of the rice rat in some way. One possibility is that the intermediate host is an earthworm or other oligochaete worm that moves to the surface when it rains.

== Literature cited ==
- Forrester, D.J. 1992. Parasites and diseases of wild mammals in Florida. University of Press of Florida, 459 pp. ISBN 978-0-8130-1072-4
- Kinsella, J.M. 1988. Comparison of helminths of rice rats, Oryzomys palustris, from freshwater and saltwater marshes in Florida. Proceedings of the Helminthological Society of Washington 55(2):275–280.
- Kinsella, J.M. and Pence, D.B. 1987. Description of Capillaria forresteri sp. n. (Nematoda: Trichuridae) from the rice rat Oryzomys palustris in Florida, with notes on its ecology and seasonal variation (subscription required). Canadian Journal of Zoology 65(5):1294–1297.
- Pisanu, B. and Bain, O. 1999. Aonchotheca musimon n. sp. (Nematoda: Capillariinae) from the mouflon Ovis musimon in the sub-Antarctic Kerguelen archipelago, with comments on the relationships with A. bilobata (Bhalerao, 1933) Moravec, 1982 and other species of the genus (subscription required). Systematic Parasitology 43(1):17–27.
