= Paracapillaria xenentodoni =

Scientific classification
- Kingdom: Animalia
- Phylum: Nematoda
- Class: Enoplea
- Order: Enoplida
- Family: Capillariidae
- Genus: Paracapillaria
- Species: P. xenentodoni

Binomial name
- Paracapillaria xenentodoni De & Maity, 1994

Species of roundworm

Paracapillaria xenentodoni is a parasitic nematode present in the migratory fish Xenentodon cancila. It has been observed in India.

== Description ==
This species has a relatively large body size, with eggs reaching 0.040–0.049 × 0.021–0.026 mm. The structure of the male caudal extremity presents two wide, lobe-like, dorso-lateral caudal projections. It has a large spicule (0.236–0.374 mm) and a transversely wrinkled and non-spiny spicular sheath. Its stichosome has 30–40 stichocytes and it has a slightly elevated anterior vulval lip.
