= Capillariasis =

Disease caused by nematodes of the genus Capillaria

Capillariasis is a disease caused by nematodes in the genus Capillaria. The two principal forms of the disease are:

- Intestinal capillariasis, caused by Capillaria philippinensis
- Hepatic capillariasis, caused by Capillaria hepatica
