= Pearsonema =

Scientific classification
- Domain: Eukaryota
- Kingdom: Animalia
- Phylum: Nematoda
- Class: Enoplea
- Order: Enoplida
- Family: Capillariidae
- Genus: Pearsonema; Freitas & Mendonca, 1960

Genus of roundworms

Pearsonema is a genus of nematodes belonging to the family Capillariidae.

The species of this genus are found in Europe and Northern America.

Species:

- Pearsonema feliscati (Diesing, 1851)
- Pearsonema mucronata (Molin, 1858)
