= Liniscus =

Liniscus may refer to:

- Liniscus (nematode), a genus of nematodes in the family Capillariidae
- Liniscus, a genus of beetles in the family Chrysomelidae, synonym of Zohranus
- Liniscus, a genus of cnidarians in the family Linuchidae, synonym of Linuche
