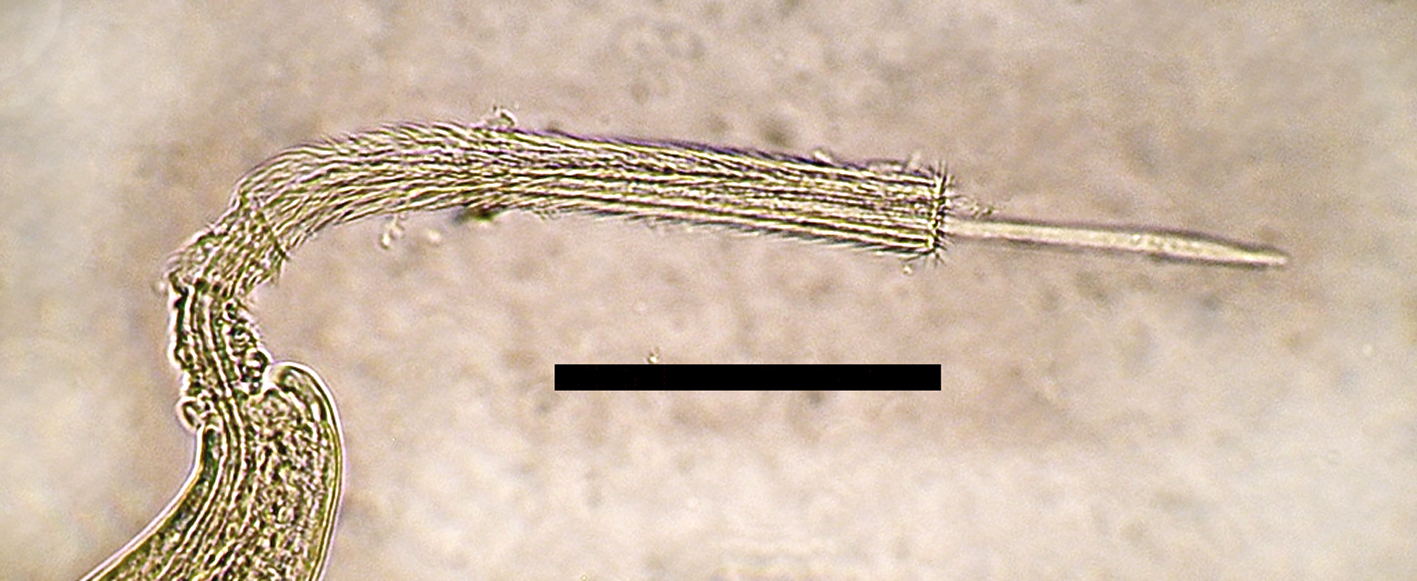
- Caudal extremity of male Eucoleus aerophilus (Capillaria aerophila) (scale bar – 100 μm)

Scientific classification
- Kingdom: Animalia
- Phylum: Nematoda
- Class: Enoplea
- Order: Enoplida
- Family: Capillariidae
- Genus: Capillaria; Zeder, 1800

Synonyms
- Calodium Dujardin, 1844; Pseudocapillaroides Moravec & Cosgrove, 1982

= Capillaria (nematode) =

Genus of roundworms

Capillaria is a genus of nematodes in the family Capillariidae (or Trichinellidae, according to some classifications).

The taxonomy of the Capillariidae is disputed, with species included within either the single genus Capillaria or 22 different genera (Amphibiocapillaria, Aonchotheca, Baruscapillaria, Calodium, Capillaria, Capillostrongyloides, Crocodylocapillaria, Echinocoleus, Eucoleus, Freitascapillaria, Gessyella, Liniscus, Paracapillaria, Paracapillaroides, Pearsonema, Paratrichosoma, Pseudocapillaria, Piscicapillaria, Pseudocapillaroides, Pterothominx, Schulmanela, and Tenoranema). Older literature, and sometimes modern medical literature, tends to use Capillaria in the broader sense. The term capillariasis is generally used for diseases produced by all species currently or formerly classified in this genus.

Some species parasitic in fish, previously classified within Capillaria, are now included in Huffmanela (family Trichosomoididae).

== Species ==
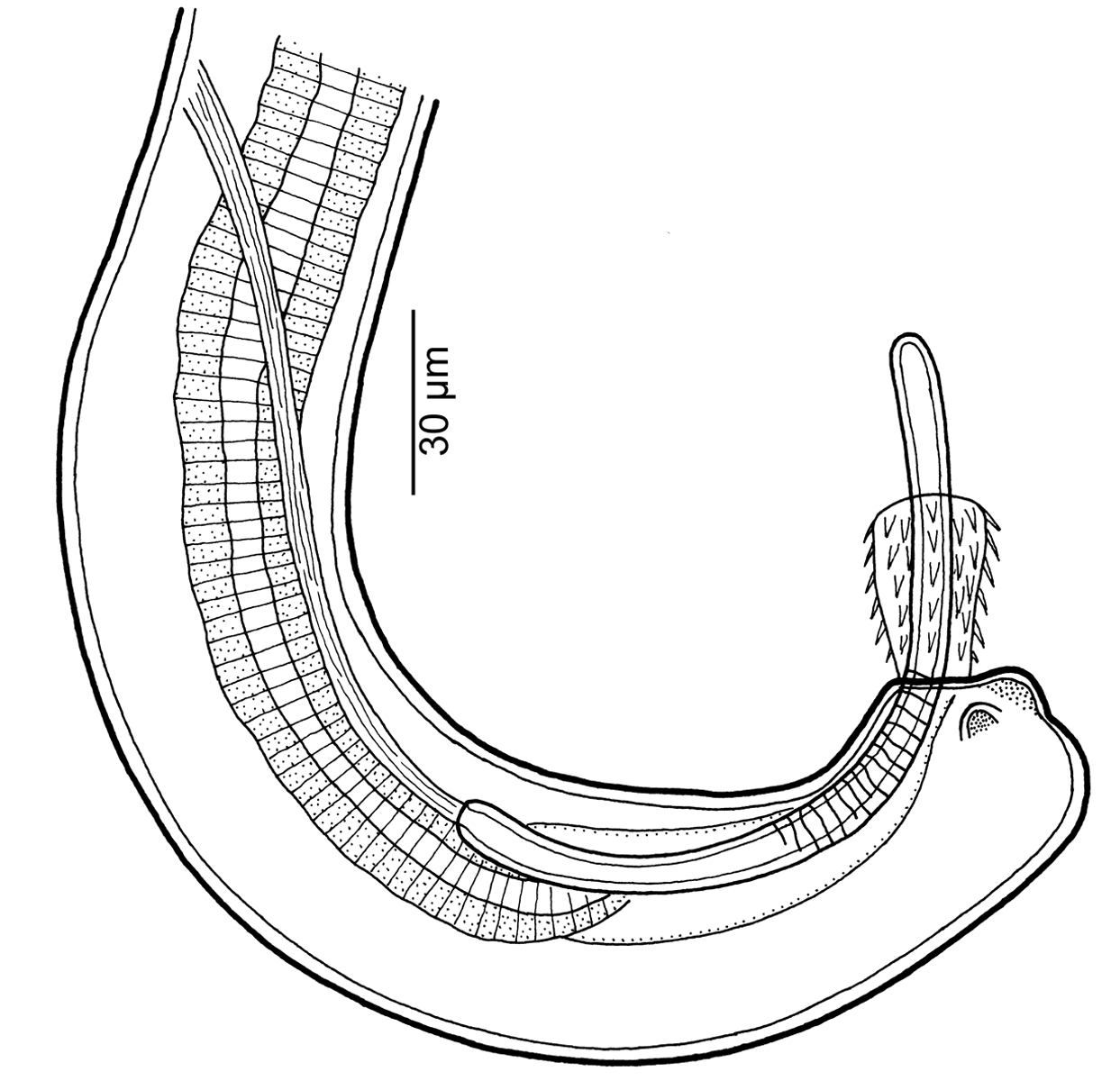
Capillaria plectropomi, caudal end of male

Species in the genus Capillaria include (among hundreds of described species):

- Capillaria aerophila; modern name Eucoleus aerophilus; a parasite of the respiratory system of foxes and other mammals
- Capillaria gastrica; a parasite of rodents
- Capillaria hepatica; modern name Calodium hepaticum; cause of hepatic capillariasis in humans
- Capillaria philippinensis; modern name Paracapillaria philippinensis; cause of intestinal capillariasis in humans
- Capillaria plica; modern name Pearsonema plica; a parasite of the urinary system of dogs and other mammals
- Capillaria feliscati; modern name Pearsonema feliscati; a parasite of the urinary system of cats and other mammals

== See also ==
- Capillariasis, a disease caused by some Capillaria species
