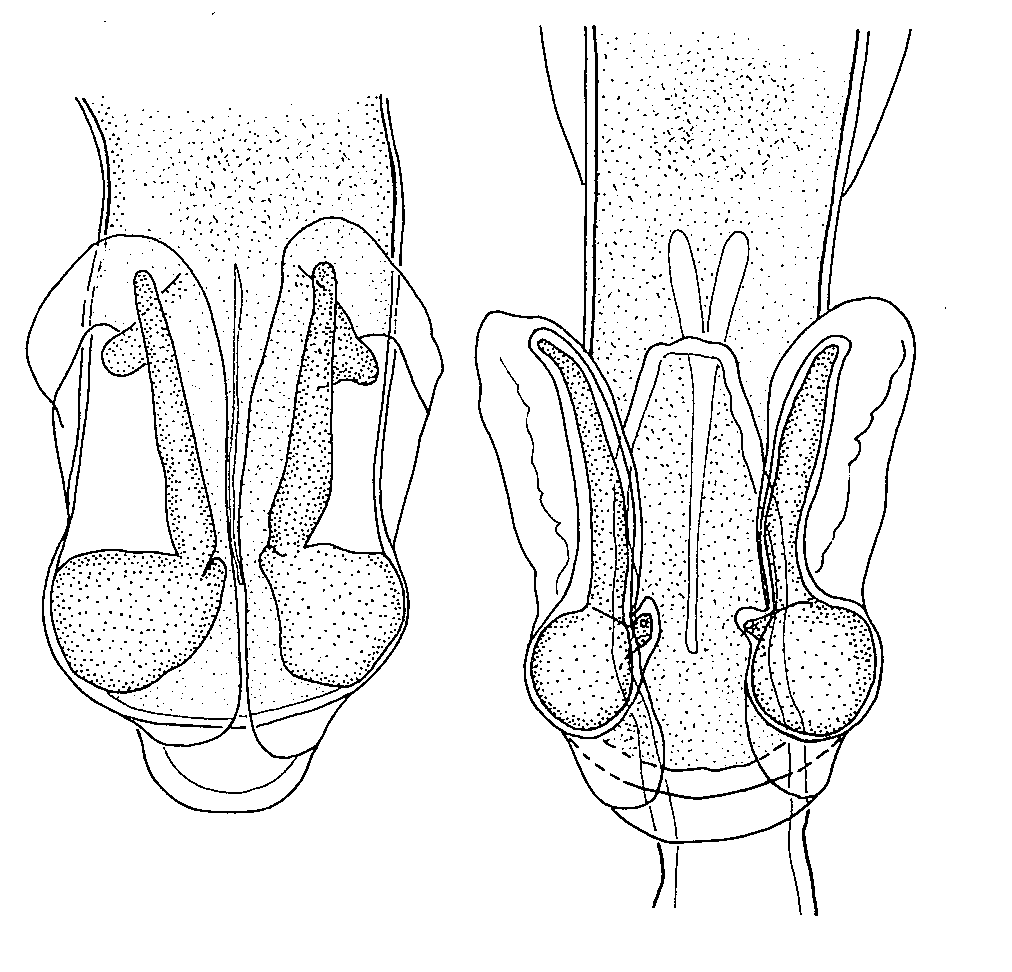

Scientific classification
- Domain: Eukaryota
- Kingdom: Animalia
- Phylum: Nematoda
- Class: Enoplea
- Order: Enoplida
- Family: Capillariidae
- Genus: Aonchotheca; López-Neyra, 1947

= Aonchotheca =

Genus of roundworms

Aonchotheca is a genus of nematodes belonging to the family Capillariidae.

The genus was first described by López-Neyra in 1947.

The species of this genus are found in Eurasia and Northern America.

Species include:

- Aonchotheca forresteri (Kinsella and Pence, 1987)
- Aonchotheca putorii (Rudolphi, 1819)
