= Tenoranema =

Scientific classification
- Domain: Eukaryota
- Kingdom: Animalia
- Phylum: Nematoda
- Class: Enoplea
- Order: Enoplida
- Family: Capillariidae
- Genus: Tenoranema; Mas-Coma & Esteban, 1985

Genus of roundworms

Tenoranema is a genus of nematodes belonging to the family Capillariidae.

Species:

- Tenoranema alcoveri Mas-Coma & Esteban, 1985
- Tenoranema magnifica (Freitas & Mendonca, 1961)
- Tenoranema rivarolai Lent, Freitas & Proenca, 1946
- Tenoranema speciosa (Beneden, 1973)
- Tenoranema wioletti Ruchljadeva, 1950
