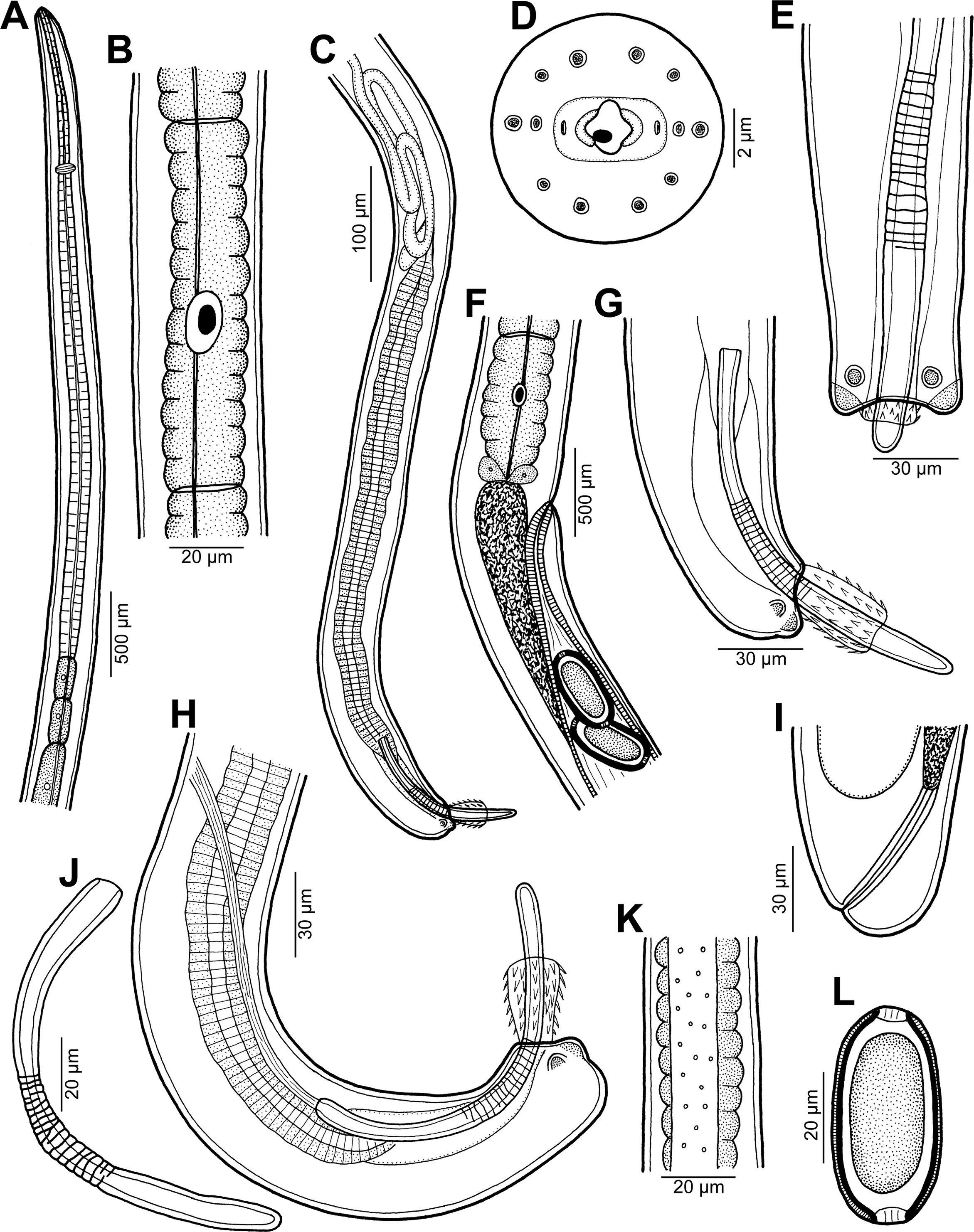
- Capillaria plectropomi

Scientific classification
- Kingdom: Animalia
- Phylum: Nematoda
- Class: Enoplea
- Order: Enoplida
- Family: Capillariidae; Railliet, 1915

= Capillariidae =

Family of roundworms

Capillariidae is a family of parasitic nematodes. All its members are parasites in vertebrates when they are in their adult stage.

== Taxonomy ==
The family Capillariidae was created by Railliet in 1915. It is accepted in the most recent classifications of the Nematoda, in which it is one of the members of the order Trichocephalida. However, Capillaria and closely related genera are sometimes included in the family Trichinellidae in other classifications.
The taxonomy of the Capillariidae is disputed: according to different classifications, the family includes the single genus Capillaria or 22 different genera (Amphibiocapillaria, Aonchotheca, Baruscapillaria, Calodium, Capillaria, Capillostrongyloides, Crocodylocapillaria, Echinocoleus, Eucoleus, Freitascapillaria, Gessyella, Liniscus, Paracapillaria, Paracapillaroides, Pearsonema, Paratrichosoma, Pseudocapillaria, Piscicapillaria, Pseudocapillaroides, Pterothominx, Schulmanela, and Tenoranema). In 2017, a new genus was added to this list: Lobocapillaria. Old literature, and sometimes modern medical literature, use Capillaria as a genus for species included in all these genera. In contrast, certain species parasitic in fish, previously classified in Capillaria, are now considered members of the genus Huffmanela (family Trichosomoididae).
The term Capillariasis is generally used for diseases produced by species of Capillaria, even if the species is now placed in another genus.

== Species ==
Species included in the Capillariidae include:

- Capillaria aerophila; modern name Eucoleus aerophilus
- Capillaria gastrica
- Capillaria hepatica; modern name Calodium hepaticum
- Capillaria philippinensis; modern name Paracapillaria philippinensis
- Capillaria plica; modern name Pearsonema plica
- Paracapillaria xenentodoni

== See also ==
- Capillariasis, a disease caused by various species of Capillariidae
- Intestinal capillariasis, a disease caused by Capillaria philippinensis (modern name Paracapillaria philippinensis)
- Hepatic capillariasis, a disease caused by Capillaria hepatica (modern name Calodium hepaticum)
