= Capillostrongyloides =

Scientific classification
- Domain: Eukaryota
- Kingdom: Animalia
- Phylum: Nematoda
- Class: Enoplea
- Order: Enoplida
- Family: Capillariidae
- Genus: Capillostrongyloides; Freitas & Lent, 1935

Genus of roundworms

Capillostrongyloides is a genus of nematodes belonging to the family Capillariidae.

The species of this genus are found in Central America.

Species:

- Capillostrongyloides arapaimae Santos, Moravec & Venturieri, 2008
- Capillostrongyloides congiopodi Cantatori, Rossini, Lanfranchi & Timi, 2009
- Capillostrongyloides norvegica Moravec & Karlsbakk, 2000
- Capillostrongyloides physiculi (Johnston & Mawson, 1945) Moravec, 1987
- Capillostrongyloides tasmanica (Johnston & Mawson, 1945) Moravec, 1987
