= Capillaria gastrica =

Scientific classification
- Domain: Eukaryota
- Kingdom: Animalia
- Phylum: Nematoda
- Class: Enoplea
- Order: Enoplida
- Family: Capillariidae
- Genus: Capillaria
- Species: C. gastrica

Binomial name
- Capillaria gastrica Baylis, 1926

Species of roundworm

Capillaria gastrica is a parasitic nematode in the genus Capillaria. Among the known host species are the marsh rice rat (Oryzomys palustris) and deermouse (Peromyscus maniculatus).

== See also ==
- List of parasites of the marsh rice rat

== Literature cited ==
- Kinsella, J.M. 1988. Comparison of helminths of rice rats, Oryzomys palustris, from freshwater and saltwater marshes in Florida. Proceedings of the Helminthological Society of Washington 55(2):275–280.
- Pulido-Flores, G., Moreno-Flores, S. and Monks, S. 2005. Helminths of rodents (Rodentia: Muridae) from Metztitlán, San Cristóbal, and Rancho Santa Elena, Hidalgo, Mexico (subscription required). Comparative Parasitology 72(2):186–192.
