= Pseudocapillaria =

Scientific classification
- Kingdom: Animalia
- Phylum: Nematoda
- Class: Enoplea
- Order: Enoplida
- Family: Capillariidae
- Genus: Pseudocapillaria; Freitas, 1959

Genus of roundworms

Pseudocapillaria is a genus of nematodes belonging to the family Capillariidae.

The genus has almost cosmopolitan distribution.

Species:

- Pseudocapillaria adriatica (Nikolaeva & Naidenova, 1964) Moravec, 1982
- Pseudocapillaria bainae (Justine & Radjuković, 1988) Moravec, 1990
- Pseudocapillaria bumpi Svitin, Bullard, Dutton, Netherlands, Syrota, Verneau & du Preez, 2021
- Pseudocapillaria carangi (Parukhin, 1971) Moravec, 1982
- Pseudocapillaria corvorum (Rudolphi, 1819)
- Pseudocapillaria decapteri (Luo, 2001) Moravec & Justine, 2010
- Pseudocapillaria echenei (Parukhin, 1967) Moravec, 1982
- Pseudocapillaria gibsoni (De & Maity, 1995) Moravec & Spratt, 1998
- Pseudocapillaria indica Moravec, Razia Beevi, Radhakrishnan & Arthur, 1993
- Pseudocapillaria lepidocephali De & Maity, 1994
- Pseudocapillaria magalhaesi (Lent & Freitas, 1937) Moravec, 1987
- Pseudocapillaria margolisi De & Maity, 1996
- Pseudocapillaria maricaensis Rodrigues, 1992
- Pseudocapillaria mergi (Madsen, 1945)
- Pseudocapillaria microspicula (Mamaev, Parukhin & Baeva, 1963) Moravec, 1982
- Pseudocapillaria novaecaledoniensis Moravec & Justine, 2010
- Pseudocapillaria ophisterni
- Pseudocapillaria petit (Justine & Bain, 1987) Moravec, 1990
- Pseudocapillaria salvelini (Polyanski, 1952) Moravec, 1982
- Pseudocapillaria tomentosa (Dujardin, 1845) Moravec, 1987
- Pseudocapillaria yucatanensis Moravec, Scholz & Vivas-Rodríguez, 1995
