= Pterothominx =

Scientific classification
- Domain: Eukaryota
- Kingdom: Animalia
- Phylum: Nematoda
- Class: Enoplea
- Order: Enoplida
- Family: Capillariidae
- Genus: Pterothominx; Freitas, 1959

Genus of roundworms

Pterothominx is a genus of nematodes belonging to the family Capillariidae.

The species of this genus are found in North America.

Species:

- Pterothominx hirudinis (Rudolphi, 1819)
- Pterothominx meleagrisgallopavo (Barile, 1912)
- Pterothominx neopulchra (Babos, 1954)
- Pterothominx pulchra (Freitas, 1934)
- Pterothominx sadovskoi (Morozov, 1956)
- Pterothominx totani (Linstow, 1875)
