= Baruscapillaria =

Scientific classification
- Domain: Eukaryota
- Kingdom: Animalia
- Phylum: Nematoda
- Class: Enoplea
- Order: Enoplida
- Family: Capillariidae
- Genus: Baruscapillaria; Moravec, 1982

Genus of worms

Baruscapillaria is a genus of nematodes belonging to the family Capillariidae.

The species of this genus are found in North America.

Species:

- Baruscapillaria anseris (Madsen, 1945)
- Baruscapillaria appendiculata (Freitas, 1933) Moravec, 1982
- Baruscapillaria belopolskaiae (Jogis, 1968)
- Baruscapillaria carbonis (Dubinin & Dubinina, 1940)
- Baruscapillaria cylindrica (Eberth, 1863)
- Baruscapillaria emberizae (Yamaguti, 1941)
- Baruscapillaria falconis (Goeze, 1782)
- Baruscapillaria longevaginata (Linstow, 1879)
- Baruscapillaria obsignata (Madsen, 1945) Moravec, 1982
- Baruscapillaria obsignata Madsen, 1945
- Baruscapillaria ovopunctata (von Linstow, 1873)
- Baruscapillaria picorum (Rudolphi, 1819)
- Baruscapillaria podicipitis (Yamaguti, 1941)
- Baruscapillaria ransomia (Barker & Noyes, 1915)
- Baruscapillaria resecta (Dujardin, 1845)
- Baruscapillaria rudolphii Moravec, Scholz & Nasincova, 1994
- Baruscapillaria spiculata (Freitas, 1933) Moravec, 1982
- Baruscapillaria tiaras (Madsen, 1945)
