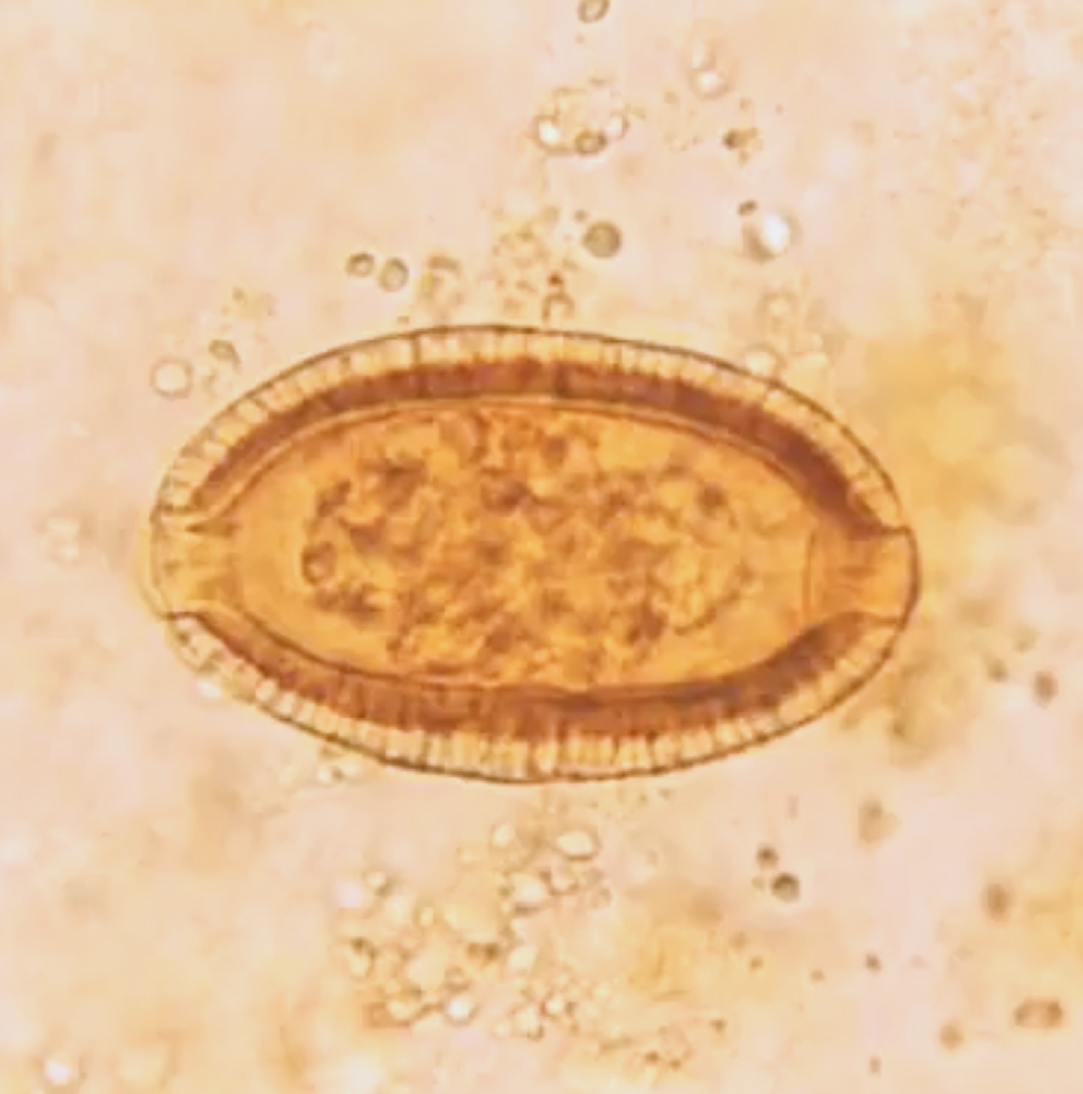
- Paracapillaria philippinensis, egg

Scientific classification
- Kingdom: Animalia
- Phylum: Nematoda
- Class: Enoplea
- Order: Enoplida
- Family: Capillariidae
- Genus: Paracapillaria; Mendonça, 1963

= Paracapillaria =

Genus of roundworms

Paracapillaria is a genus of parasitic nematodes. Species of the genus Paracapillaria parasitise fishes and amphibians, reptiles (snakes), and a single species, Paracapillaria philippinensis (Chitwood, Velasquez & Salazar, 1968) (often referred to as Capillaria philippinensis), is known from birds and mammals including man.

There are about a dozen species parasites in fish, such as Paracapillaria rhamdiae Moravec, González-Solís & Vargas-Vásquez, 1995. or Paracapillaria gastrica Moravec & Justine, 2020
