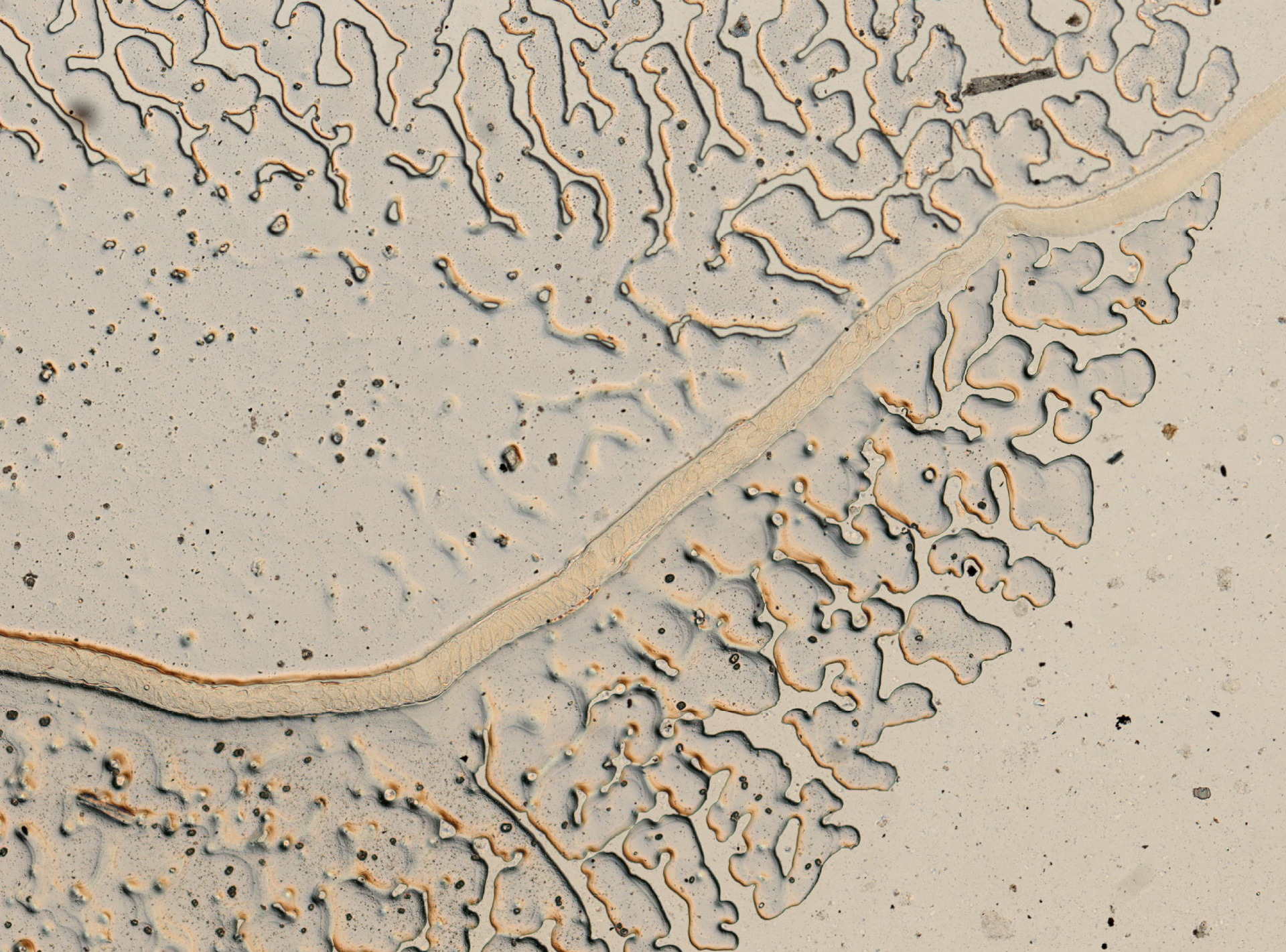

Scientific classification
- Domain: Eukaryota
- Kingdom: Animalia
- Phylum: Nematoda
- Class: Enoplea
- Order: Enoplida
- Family: Capillariidae
- Genus: Capillaria
- Species: C. feliscati

Binomial name
- Capillaria feliscati Diesing, 1851

= Capillaria feliscati =

Species of roundworm

Capillaria feliscati (also known as Pearsonema feliscati), the cat bladder worm is a worm that affects cats, and seldom dogs. Its main final hosts are wild carnivores (foxes, wolves, coyotes, hedgehogs, etc.). It is a urinary tract nematode, though its occurrence is rare. C. feliscati are small, delicate, yellowish, thread-like worms. Adults are approximately between 16 and 53 millimetres (0.63 and 2.09 in) in length.

== Pathology ==
The parasite can irritate the mucosa of the urinary system (bladder and tract), sometimes with painful urination and incontinence. They reportedly infect the large intestine but have been found in the urinary bladder of the cat, resulting in feline lower urinary tract disease (FLUTD). In cats with a heavy infection, symptoms can include frequent urination, painful urination, bloody urine, straining to urinate.

Infected cats are usually over 8 months of age. Clinical signs or symptoms of affected cats include abdominal pain, fever, distended painful bladder and urinary blockage. Diagnosis is based on finding larvae and fragments of adult stages in urine sediment. The ova are characteristic in appearance: football-shaped with plugs at both ends of the ova.

== Treatment and prevention ==
There are so far no true vaccines against Capillaria worms. This parasite is readily treated with proprietary medicines such as fenbendazole and ivermectin. Fenbendazole is given at 25 mg/kg every 12h for 10 days.
