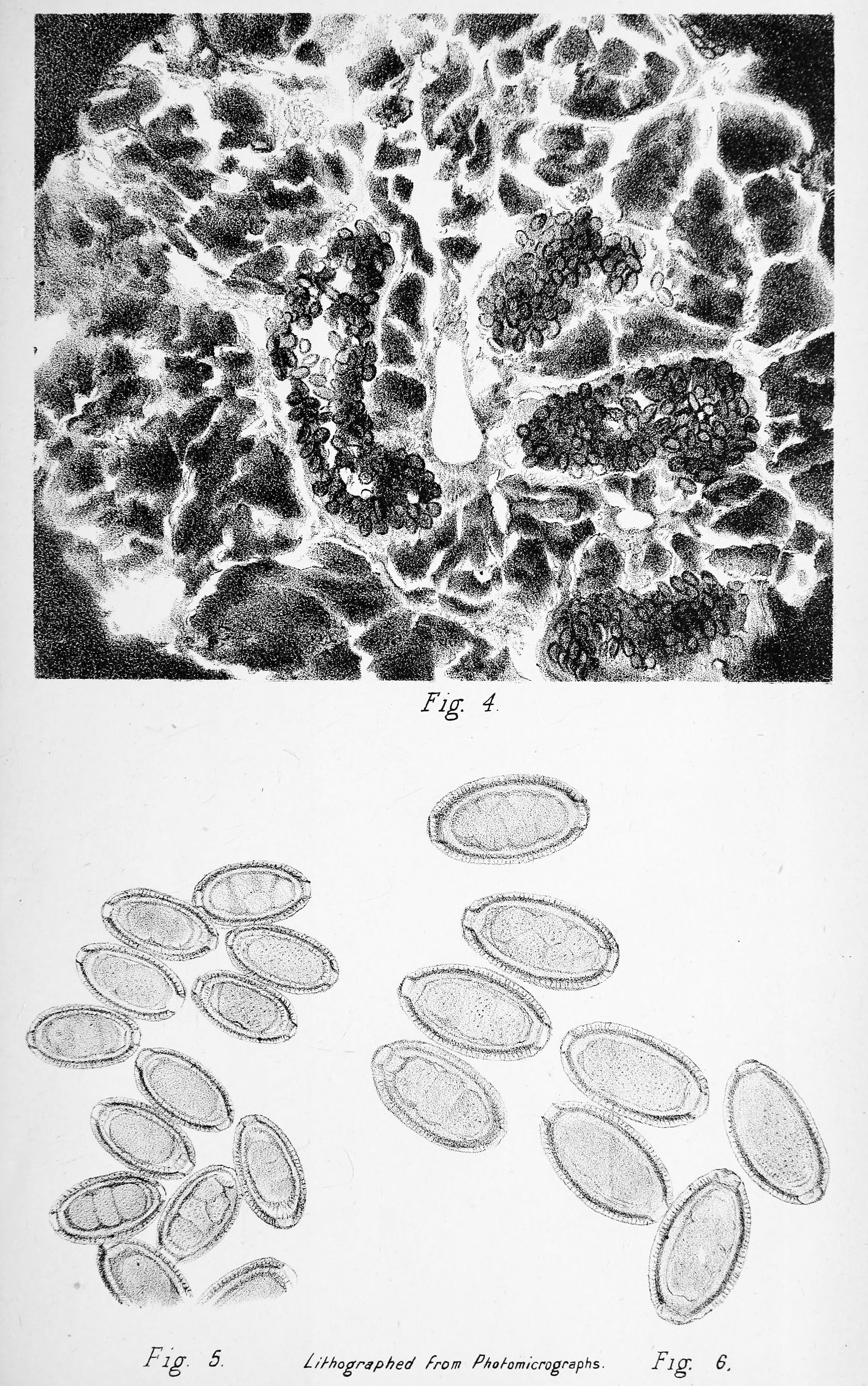
- One of the plates published with the original description of the species, showing the masses of eggs in the liver of the host (above) and free alive eggs (below).

Scientific classification
- Kingdom: Animalia
- Phylum: Nematoda
- Class: Enoplea
- Order: Enoplida
- Family: Capillariidae
- Genus: Capillaria
- Species: C. hepatica

Binomial name
- Capillaria hepatica Bancroft, 1893

= Capillaria hepatica =

Species of roundworm

Capillaria hepatica is a parasitic nematode which causes hepatic capillariasis in rodents and numerous other mammal species, including humans. The life cycle of C. hepatica may be completed in a single host species. However, the eggs, which are laid in the liver, must mature outside of the host body (in the environment) prior to infecting a new host. Death and decomposition of the host in which the adults reach sexual maturity are necessary for completion of the life cycle.

== Discovery and taxonomy ==
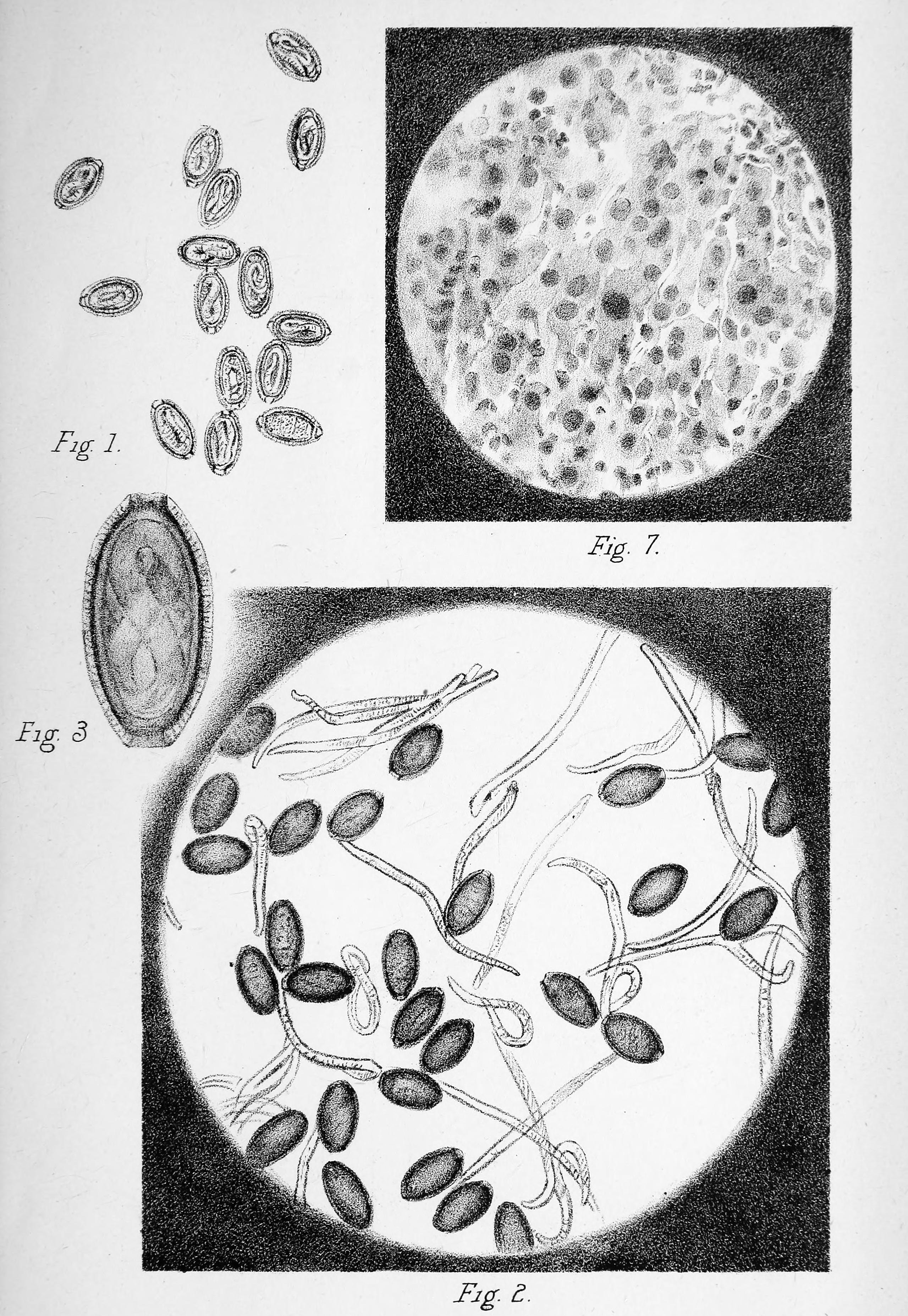
One of the two plates published with the original description of the species by Thomas L. Bancroft.

This species was first described in 1893, from specimens found in the liver of Rattus norvegicus, and named Trichocephalus hepaticus. Various authors have subsequently renamed it Trichosoma hepaticum, Capillaria hepatica, Hepaticola hepatica and Calodium hepaticum. Currently it is usually referred to as either Capillaria hepatica or, less often, Calodium hepaticum.

== Hosts and distribution ==
Adults are often found in dozens of rodent species, but also occur in a wide variety of other wild and domestic mammals, and occasionally humans. C. hepatica has been found in temperate and tropical zones on every continent and infestation rates of wild-caught rats of up to 100% have been reported.

Usually, Capillaria hepatica is found in rodents, monkeys and other animals. Capillaria hepatica is rarely found in humans and at least 40 cases have been reported. There are no endemic areas of infection with C. hepatica and human infection primarily results from zoonotic transmission.

Of the human infections, most have been found in children under the age of 5.

== Tissue niche and morphology ==
The tissue niche of this parasite is the liver. The adult females will deposit eggs in the parenchyma of the liver. Occasionally in humans larvae will migrate to the lungs, kidneys and other organs.

Adult worms take the shape of a slender nematode, with the anterior part of the body narrow and the posterior part gradually swelling. The females measure about 53–78mm x 0.11–0.20mm, but the males are approximately 24–37mm x 0.07–0.10mm. The adult worms are rarely seen intact, as they mature and die in the parenchyma of the liver. The adult females lay eggs that are about 48-66μm x 28-36μm. The shell of the eggs is striated with shallow polar prominences at either end. Numerous mini-pores can be seen in the outer shell as well. Unembryonated eggs may be ingested by a carnivore, in which case they are harmless and pass out in the feces. Eggs will embryonate in the environment, where they require air and damp soil to become infective. Under optimal conditions this takes about 30 days. Larvae are juvenile versions of the adult worm.

== Life cycle ==
Hosts ingest C. hepatica eggs (from sources outlined below) which hatch into first stage larvae (L1). The L1 larvae bore through the intestinal wall and are carried to the liver by the hepatic portal vein. Development from the L1 stage to sexually mature adults occurs in the liver within 18–21 days. Eggs are laid in the liver parenchyma of the host throughout the adult worm's life span, which lasts for about 30–40 days. Up to 938,000 eggs have been reported from the liver of a single rodent host.

The eggs in the liver exist in a state of arrested development – they are unable to develop into larvae until they spend some time outside of the host, in the environment. Escaping from the liver tissue may be accomplished either by the death and decomposition of the host's body, or by the consumption and digestion of the host by a predator or scavenger. If the host is eaten, the eggs will pass into the environment in the feces of the predator or scavenger. In the environment, eggs require 4–5 weeks to develop, and may remain viable in a dormant state for several more months. Once these "environmentally-conditioned" eggs are eaten by a suitable host, the first stage larvae (L1) hatch in the intestine and continue the life cycle. Humans are usually infected after ingesting embryonated eggs in fecal-contaminated food, water, or soil.

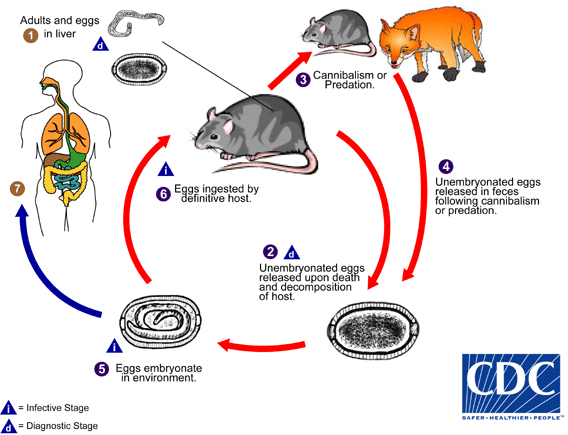
Parasitic cycle, as given by the Centers for Disease Control and Prevention.

== Pathogenesis and survival in host ==
In humans Capillaria hepatica causes hepatic capillariasis, a serious liver disorder. The nematode wanders through the host liver causing loss of liver cells and thereby loss of function. However, as the adult C. hepatica begin to die in the liver tissue, their decomposition accelerates the immune response of the host. This response leads to chronic inflammation and encapsulation of the dead worms in collagen fibers, and eventually to septal fibrosis (abnormal connective tissue growth) and cirrhosis of the liver. The eggs that are left behind can become encased by granulomatous tissue, with large sections of the parenchyma replaced by these egg masses. C. hepatica can also cause hepatomegaly. Infections of C. hepatica can present with several clinical symptoms, including abdominal pain in the liver area, weight loss, decreased appetite, fever and chills, hepatitis (liver inflammation), ascites (excess fluid in the peritoneal cavity) and hepatolithiasis (gallstones in the bile ducts).

This parasite can be fatal in humans, as transmission and survival of the parasite depend on death of the definitive host in order for the eggs to reach soil and water to embryonate.

== Diagnosis and treatment ==
Diagnosis is made by finding eggs or adults of C. hepatica in liver tissue from biopsy or necropsy samples. The encapsulated eggs and adults may appear as white nodules which measure 2–3mm in diameter on the surface and interior of the liver at autopsy. Key identification features of this parasite are a double-layered, striated shell and shallow polar prominences of the egg and a narrowing at anterior end and gradual swelling at posterior end of the adult worm. Identification of C. hepatica eggs in the stool does not result from infection of the human host, but from ingestion by that host of livers from infected animals, the eggs will then pass out harmlessly in the feces. Most cases have been determined after death because clinical symptoms resemble those of numerous liver disorders.

Successful treatment of human cases with thiabendazole or albendazole (with or without corticosteroids) have been reported. Albendazole must be taken with food because a fatty meal will increase the bioavailability of the drug.

Two ways of preventing C. hepatica infections in humans are to institute effective rodent control programs and to prevent dogs and cats from eating rodents.

== Paleoparasitology ==
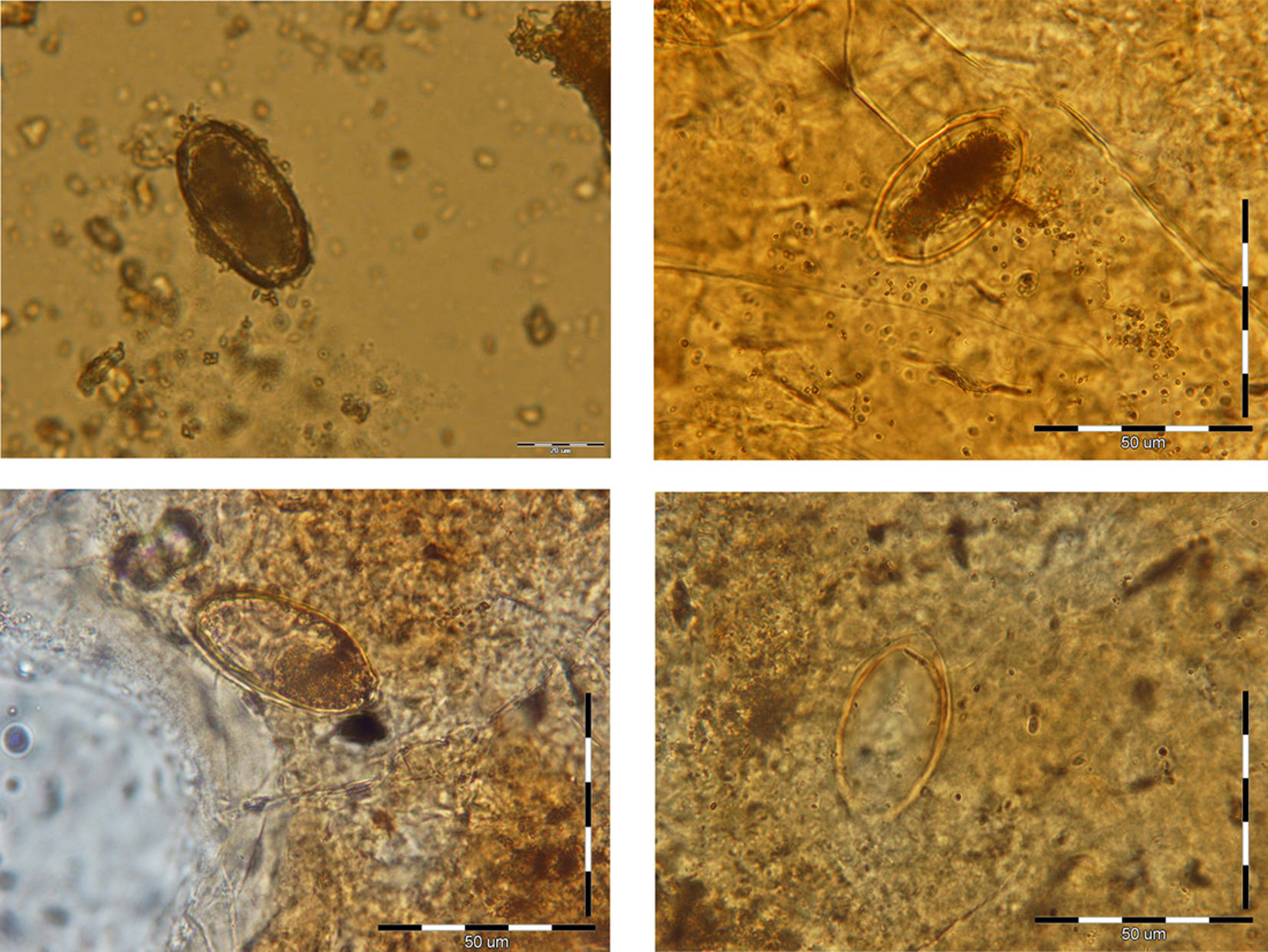
Capillaria hepatica eggs from the corpse of an adolescent from the late Roman period in France

The first paleoparasitological record of human hepatic capillariasis was published in 2014. Two calcified objects recovered from a 3rd to 4th-century grave of an adolescent in Amiens (Northern France) were identified as probable hydatid cysts. By using thin-section petrographic techniques, probable Capillaria hepatica eggs were identified in the wall of the cysts. The authors claimed that hepatic capillariasis could be expected given the poor level of environmental hygiene prevalent in this period. Identification of tissue-dwelling parasites such as C. hepatica in archaeological remains is particularly dependent on preservation conditions and taphonomic changes and should be interpreted with caution due to morphological similarities with Trichuris sp. eggs.

== Research uses ==
The selective liver damage by C. hepatica in rodents has been used in model systems to study the extensive regeneration capabilities of the mammalian liver, and for testing antifibrotic drugs.

C. hepatica has attracted interest for use in Australia as a biocontrol of the house mouse, Mus musculus. It has been moderately successful in Southern Australia.
