= Capillaria plica =

Scientific classification
- Kingdom: Animalia
- Phylum: Nematoda
- Class: Enoplea
- Order: Enoplida
- Family: Capillariidae
- Genus: Capillaria
- Species: C. plica

Binomial name
- Capillaria plica Rudolphi, 1819

Synonyms
- Pearsonema plica

Species of roundworm

Capillaria plica (dog bladder worm) is a parasitic nematode which is most often found in the urinary bladder, and occasionally in the kidneys, of dogs and foxes. It has also been found in the domestic cat, and various wild mammals. Its presence usually produces no clinical symptoms, but in some cases, it leads to hematuria (blood in the urine), cystitis (inflammation of the urinary bladder), or difficulty in urination.

== Taxonomy and description ==
This species was originally described in 1819, and named Capillaria plica. In 1982, the suggestion was made that C. plica be transferred to the genus Pearsonema Freitas & Mendonça 1960, as Pearsonema plica. Currently, both names are used in the literature with roughly equal frequency. For example, searches of the PubMed database performed on 22 Nov 2008 yielded the same number of hits dated 2000 or later using either Capillaria plica or Pearsonema plica.

== Hosts and distribution ==
Capillaria plica is often found in the urine, urinary bladder or kidneys of dogs and cats in North America, Europe, Asia and Africa. It has also been identified in the urinary bladder and kidneys of several wild mammals in North America and Europe:

- American badger (Taxidea taxus; North America)
- American mink (Mustela vison; in introduced European populations)
- Brown bear (Ursus arctos; Russia)
- Coyote (Canis latrans; North America)
- European badger (Meles meles; Europe)
- European mink (Mustela lutreola; Europe)
- Fisher (Martes pennanti; North America)
- Lynx (Felis lynx; Lithuania)
- Marten (Martes americanus; North America)
- Masked shrew (Sorex cinereus; North America)
- Northern short-tailed shrew (Blarina brevicauda; North America)
- Raccoon (Procyon lotor; North America)
- Raccoon dog (Nyctereutes procyonoides; Europe)
- Red fox (Vulpes vulpes; North America and Europe)
- Skunk (Mephitis mephitis; North America)
- Wolf (Canis lupus; Europe)

== Life cycle ==
In dogs and cats, eggs of Capillaria plica are released in the urine of the mammalian definitive host. First stage larvae (L1) develop within the eggshell in 30–36 days. When eaten by the intermediate host—earthworms of the genera Lumbricus or Dendrobaena—the L1 larvae hatch in the earthworm's intestine. The larvae burrow through the intestinal wall and become embedded in connective tissue throughout the worm's body. If the earthworm is eaten by a suitable mammalian host, the larvae molt into second stage larvae (L2), burrow through the intestinal wall, and molt again into third stage larvae (L3). The L3 are carried through the circulatory system to the glomeruli of the kidneys. From there, they travel down the ureter to the urinary bladder. By 33 days post-infection, third (L3) and fourth-stage larvae (L4) are found in the urinary bladder. Here they mature into adults and reproduce sexually, shedding fertilized eggs into the urine of the host within about 60 days of infection. Detailed life cycle studies have not been carried out with wild animal definitive hosts.

== Prevalence ==
Prevalence rates of up to 50% in wild hosts and 76% in kennel dogs have been reported.

== Clinical symptoms ==
Most infected animals exhibit no clinical symptoms. In cases of heavy infestation, symptoms may include cystitis (inflammation of the urinary bladder), mild proteinuria (protein in the urine), and hematuria (blood in the urine). Mild inflammation of the ureter has also been reported.

== Diagnosis and treatment ==
Diagnosis in cases of hematuria or cystitis is made by finding eggs in the urine sediment. Successful treatment with levamisole, ivermectin or fenbendazole has been reported.
