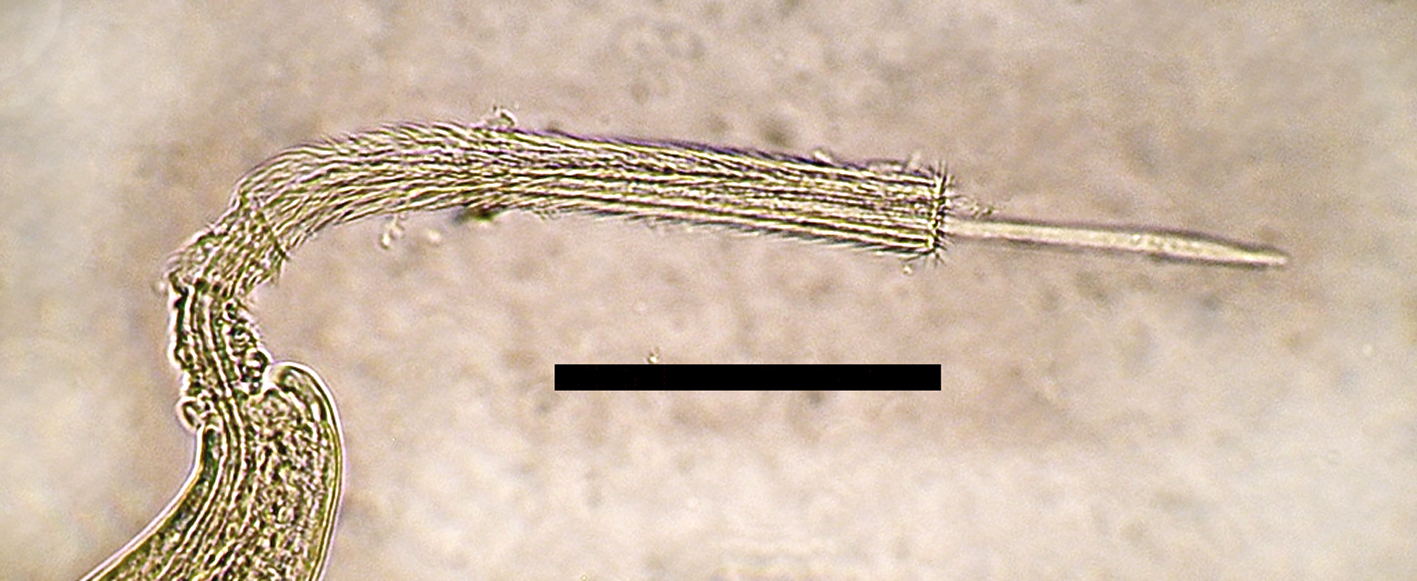
- Male spicule of Eucoleus aerophilus

Scientific classification
- Kingdom: Animalia
- Phylum: Nematoda
- Class: Enoplea
- Order: Enoplida
- Family: Capillariidae
- Genus: Eucoleus; Dujardin, 1845

= Eucoleus =

Genus of roundworms

Eucoleus is a genus of nematodes belonging to the family Capillariidae. Dwelling "primarily in the airways of foxes, it can be found worldwide in dogs and cats", in which it causes a disease known as eucoleosis.

The genus has cosmopolitan distribution.

Species:

- Eucoleus aerophilus (Creplin, 1839)
- Eucoleus annulatus (Molin, 1858)
- Eucoleus bacillatus (Eberth, 1863)
- Eucoleus baskakowi Schulz, 1929
- Eucoleus boehemi (Supperer, 1953)
- Eucoleus boehmi (Supperer, 1953)
- Eucoleus contortus (Creplin, 1839)
- Eucoleus dispar (Dujardin, 1845)
- Eucoleus dubius (Travassos, 1917)
- Eucoleus garfiai (Gallego & Mas-Coma, 1975)
- Eucoleus gastricus (Baylis, 1926)
- Eucoleus obtusiuscula (Rudolphi, 1819)
- Eucoleus oesophagicola (Soltys, 1952)
- Eucoleus perforans (Kotlan & Orosz, 1931)
- Eucoleus schvalovoj Kontrimavichus, 1963
- Eucoleus spiralis Molin, 1858
- Eucoleus tenuis Dujardin, 1845
- Eucoleus vanelli (Rudolphi, 1819)
