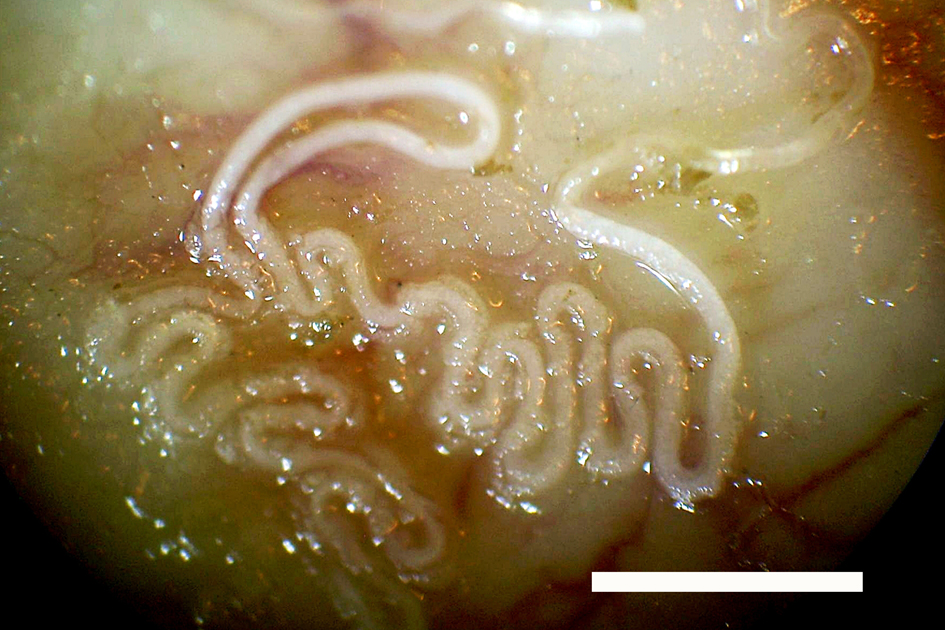
- Capillaria aerophila in the trachea of a fox

Scientific classification
- Kingdom: Animalia
- Phylum: Nematoda
- Class: Enoplea
- Order: Enoplida
- Family: Capillariidae
- Genus: Capillaria
- Species: C. aerophila

Binomial name
- Capillaria aerophila (Creplin, 1839)

= Capillaria aerophila =

Species of roundworm

Capillaria aerophila is a nematode parasite found in the respiratory tract of foxes, dogs, and various other carnivorous mammals. A few cases of human infestation have also been reported. Though it is sometimes called a "lungworm", this term usually refers to other species of nematodes. Infestation by C. aerophila is referred to as "pulmonary capillariasis" (occasionally spelled "capillariosis), "bronchial capillariasis", or (rarely) "thominxosis". This parasite has a direct life cycle, meaning that the life cycle can be completed in a single host. C. aerophila usually causes only minor clinical symptoms, such as irritation of the respiratory tract and coughing. However, secondary bacterial infections of the respiratory tract, including pneumonia, may develop in heavy infestations. Treatment with anthelmintics, such as levamisole or fenbendazole, is usually sufficient to cure C. aerophila infestations.

== Taxonomy and description ==
This species was originally described in 1839, from specimens found in the trachea of a wolf, and named Trichosoma aerophila. It was transferred to the genus Eucoleus (as Eucoleus aerophilus) by Dujardin in 1845, and to the genus Capillaria (as Capillaria aerophila) in 1911, and is sometimes referred to as Thominx aerophilum. The changes to the end of the species name in each genus, whether it ends with "-a", "-us" or "-um", are necessary to adhere to the rules of Latin grammar.

Males generally range from 15–25 mm long, with a maximum width of 62 μm, while females are 18–32 mm long with a maximum width of 105 μm. Some sources report that they are larger when they occur in the nasal sinuses.

== Hosts and distribution ==
Capillaria aerophila has been found on every continent, and occurs in dogs, cats, and a wide range of wild mammals. The following species have been reported as hosts:

- American marten (Martes americana) in North America
- American black bear (Ursus americanus) in North America
- Arctic fox (Alopex lagopus) in Iceland
- Badger (Taxidea taxus) in North America
- Beech marten (or stone marten; Martes foina) in Europe
- Bobcat (Lynx rufus) in North America
- Brown bear (Ursus arctos caucasicus) in Russia
- Cat (Felis catus) in Asia, Australia, Europe, New Zealand, North America, and South America
- Coyote (Canis latrans) in North America
- Crab-eating fox (Cerdocyon thous) in South America
- Dog (Canis lupus familiaris) in Asia, Europe, North America, South America
- Egyptian mongoose (Herpestes ichneumon) in Europe (Republic of Buryatia)
- Eurasian lynx (Lynx lynx) in Europe
- European pine marten (Martes martes) in Europe
- European polecat (Mustela putorius) in Europe
- Florida panther (Puma concolor coryi) in North America
- Golden jackal (Canis aureus) in Azerbaijan
- Gray fox (Urocyon cinereoargenteus) in North America
- Gray wolf (Canis lupus) in Europe
- Hedgehog (Erinaceus sp.) in Europe, New Zealand
- Human (Homo sapiens) only a few cases reported in Europe, Iran and Morocco
- Iberian lynx (Lynx pardinus) in Europe
- Iriomote cat (Prionailurus iriomotensis) in Japan
- Japanese marten (Martes melampus) in Japan
- Kit fox (Vulpes macrotis) in North America
- Leopard cat (Prionailurus bengalensis euptailurus) in Japan
- Opossum (Didelphis virginiana) in North America
- Raccoon (Procyon lotor) in North America
- Raccoon dog (Nyctereutes procyonoides) in Europe and Japan
- Red fox (Vulpes vulpes) in Europe and North America
- Sable (Martes zibellina) in Buryatia (Asia)
- Wildcat (Felis silvestris) in Europe

== Life cycle ==
Capillaria aerophila has a direct life cycle, meaning that it can be completed in one host. The adults lay eggs in the lungs. The eggs are coughed up and swallowed by the host; and are then passed in the feces. In about 5–7 weeks, the larvae develop into the infective stage within the egg envelope in the soil. The infective larvae remain viable for up to 1 year. When a suitable host eats these mature eggs, the larvae hatch in the intestines and migrate to the lungs. They mature into adults about 40 days post-infection. Earthworms may act as paratenic hosts, by eating the C. aerophila eggs and infecting mammalian hosts when eaten by the mammals. However, the involvement of the earthworms is not necessary for the completion of the C. aerophila life cycle.

== Prevalence ==
Reported infestation rates in dogs and cats which are kept as pets in Europe and North America are generally less than 10%. In wildlife, rates as high as 74% and 88% have been reported for wild foxes.

== Clinical symptoms ==
Most cases of Capillaria aerophila infestation in dogs and cats are without serious clinical symptoms. Heavy infestations may result in inflammation of the respiratory tract (rhinitis, tracheitis or bronchitis), or secondary bacterial infections of the respiratory tract, including bronchopneumonia. These developments are usually characterized by a whistling sound when the animal breathes, frequent sneezing, or a deep, wheezing cough.

In humans, symptoms include coughing, fever, bronchitis, dyspnea (shortness of breath), blood in the saliva, and elevated levels of eosinophils in the blood (eosinophilia).

Most reports of C. aerophila in wildlife are simply parasite field surveys, and do not mention specific symptoms. However, the involvement of C. aerophila infestation and pneumonia, in addition to other parasites, in the death of an opossum has been reported.

== Diagnosis, treatment and prevention ==
Infestation is easily diagnosed by the presence of C. aerophila eggs in the nasal or tracheal lavage, or the feces of infested animals. Standard anthelmintics, such as ivermectin or fenbendazole, are recommended for treatment of dogs. Humans infested with C. aerophila have been successfully treated with albendazole and mebendazole.

For animals kept in outdoor pens, proper drainage and allowing sunlight to hit the floor of the pen have been suggested to minimize the spread of infestation.
