= Liniscus (nematode) =

Scientific classification
- Domain: Eukaryota
- Kingdom: Animalia
- Phylum: Nematoda
- Class: Enoplea
- Order: Enoplida
- Family: Capillariidae
- Genus: Liniscus; Dujardin, 1845

Genus of roundworms

Liniscus is a genus of nematodes belonging to the family Capillariidae.

The species of this genus are found in America.

Species:

- Liniscus diazae Robles, Carballo & Navone, 2008
- Liniscus incrassatus Diesing, 1851
- Liniscus papillosus (Polonio, 1860)
- Liniscus sunci (Chen, 1937)
