= Capillaria philippinensis =

Scientific classification
- Domain: Eukaryota
- Kingdom: Animalia
- Phylum: Nematoda
- Class: Enoplea
- Order: Enoplida
- Family: Capillariidae
- Genus: Capillaria
- Species: C. philippinensis

Binomial name
- Capillaria philippinensis Velasquez, Chitwood and Salazar, 1968

Species of roundworm

Capillaria philippinensis is a parasitic nematode which causes intestinal capillariasis. This sometimes fatal disease was first discovered in Northern Luzon, Philippines, in 1964. Cases have also been reported from China, Egypt, Indonesia, Iran, Japan, Korea, Lao PDR, Taiwan and Thailand. Cases diagnosed in Italy and Spain were believed to be acquired abroad, with one case possibly contracted in Colombia. The natural life cycle of C. philippinensis is believed to involve fish as intermediate hosts, and fish-eating birds as definitive hosts. Humans acquire C. philippinensis by eating small species of infested fish whole and raw.

== Discovery and nomenclature ==
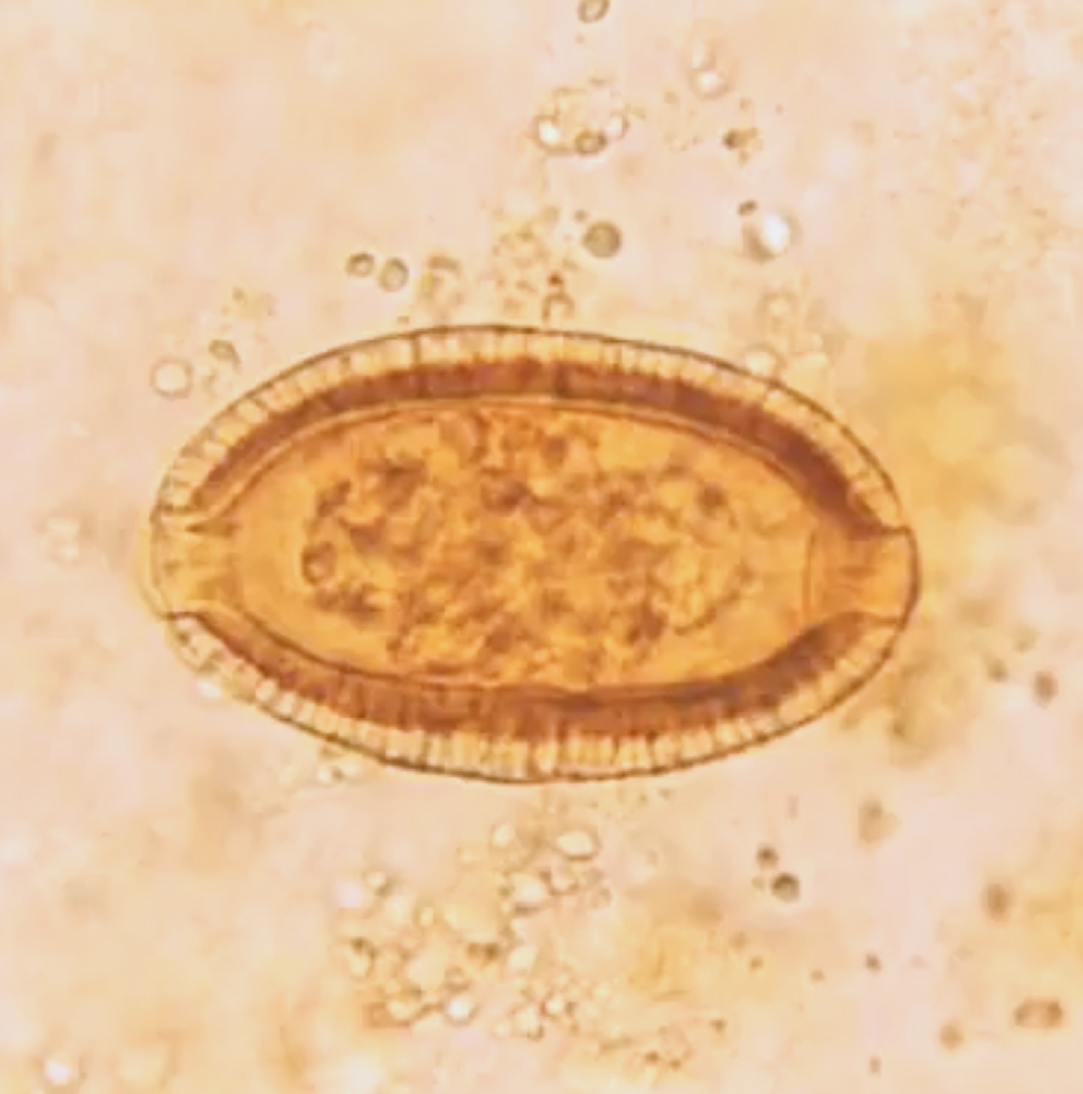
Capillaria philippinensis egg

Between the first case reported in 1964 and the end of 1967, more than 1000 cases were documented in and around Northern Luzon particularly at Tagudin, Ilocos Sur, including 77 deaths. Witch doctors were hired by the locals to exorcise the curse placed on them by the river god, which they believed was responsible for this sudden disaster.

In 1968, the cause was identified as Capillaria philippinensis. Adult C. philippinensis are very small, with males measuring 1.5–3.9 mm long and 23–28 μm maximum width, while adult females are 2.3–5.3 mm long and 29–47 μm maximum width. Eggs measure 36–45 μm long and 20 μm wide, and are described as peanut-shaped with a striated shell.

This species has been transferred to the genus Aonchotheca, as Aonchotheca philippinensis, and to the genus Paracapillaria, as Paracapillaria philippinensis. However, this species is almost universally referred to as Capillaria philippinensis in the current medical literature.

== Hosts and life cycle ==
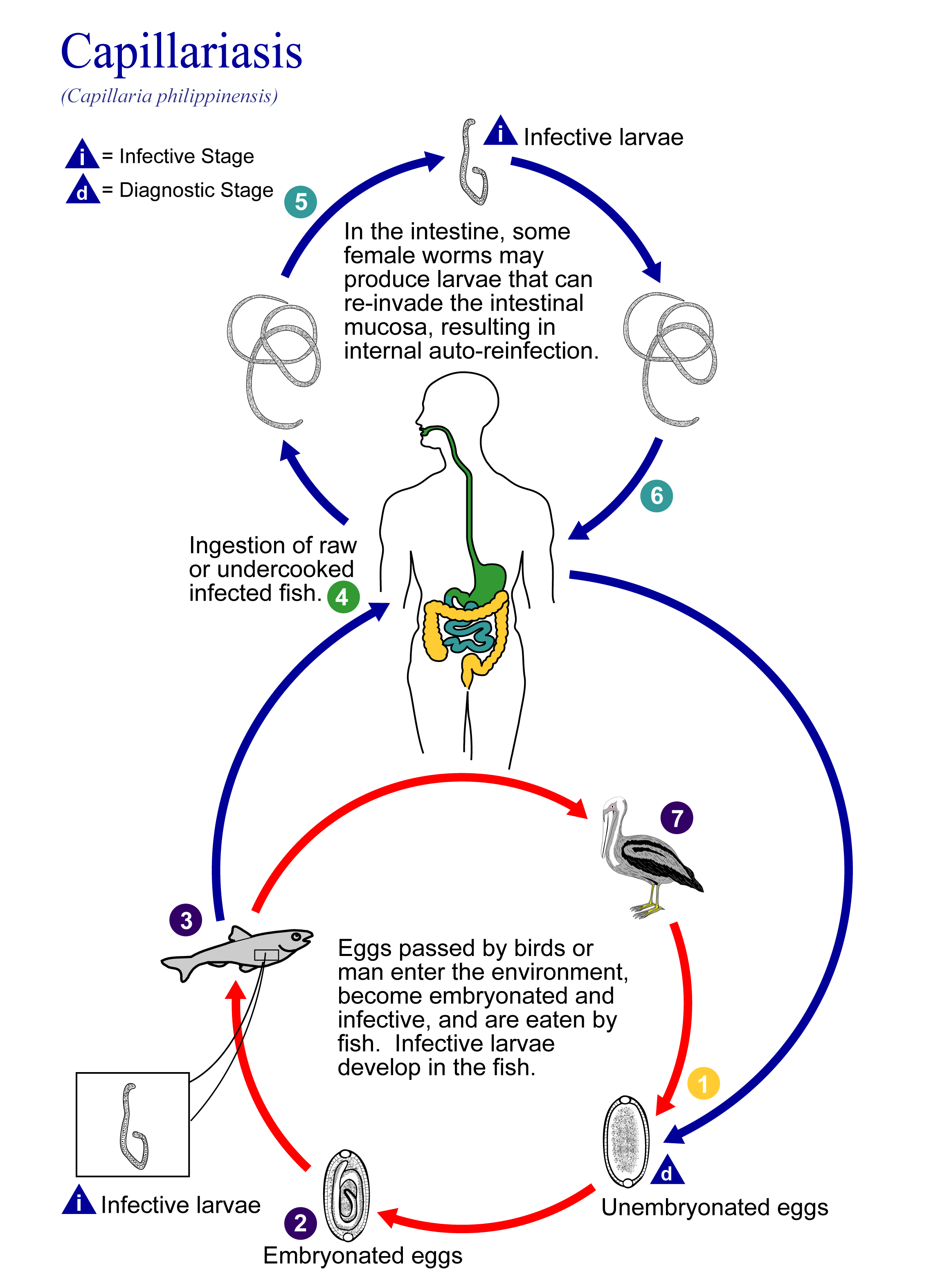
Capillaria philippinensis life cycle

The complete life cycle of C. philippinensis has been demonstrated in experimental studies, and may be either indirect (involving an intermediate host) or direct (complete in one host).

While the natural host range is not known, experimental infestations of several fishes, including Cyprinus carpio, Puntius gonionotus, Rasbora borapetensis, Eleotris melanosoma, Ambassis commersoni and Apogon sp., with C. philippinensis eggs yielded infective larvae. Experimental infestations with larvae of several birds, including Amaurornis phoenicurus, Ardeola bacchus, Nycticorax nycticorax, Bubulcus ibis, Ixobrychus sinensis, Gallinula chloropus, and Rostratula benghalensis, yielded mature adults.

=== Direct life cycle ===
Researchers also found that feeding just a few dozen larvae from the intestines of fish to Mongolian gerbils (Meriones unguiculatus) or monkeys (Macaca sp.) led to infestations with thousands of adult worms through "autoinfection". Autoinfection is when the offspring produced by adults can reinfest the same host, allowing the infestation to multiply within a single host animal. Both oviparous (egg-laying) and larviparous (giving birth to active larvae) adult female C. philippinensis were found in Mongolian gerbils and some birds. The experimentally infested monkeys never developed any clinical symptoms, even during prolonged, active infestations. Of several rodents tested, only Mongolian gerbils developed severe symptoms due to infestation and died.

== Pathology ==
Although C. philippinensis infections are rare, it can serve as an indicator that one is being exposed to raw or undercooked fish. Early diagnosis of the parasite is beneficial so the number of worms in an infected person would not increase.

== Diagnosis ==
This parasite can be diagnosed by taking a tissue biopsy from the small intestine or by examining stool samples through a microscope. In a heavily infected person, it is best to examine their feces because it will show an abundance of adult worms and eggs. When looking at the eggs of C. philippinensis, one must be able to distinguish it from the eggs of Trichuris trichiura. C. philippinensis eggs have nonprotruding polar plugs and are slightly smaller than T. trichiura eggs.

== Treatment ==
C. philippinensis infections should be treated with 200 mg of mebendazole. This drug is taken twice a day for 20 days or until all symptoms subside and there are no longer eggs present in the stool samples of the patient. Another drug that may be used is albendazole 400 mg, which is taken orally every day for at least 10 days.
