= Intestinal capillariasis =

Capillariasis
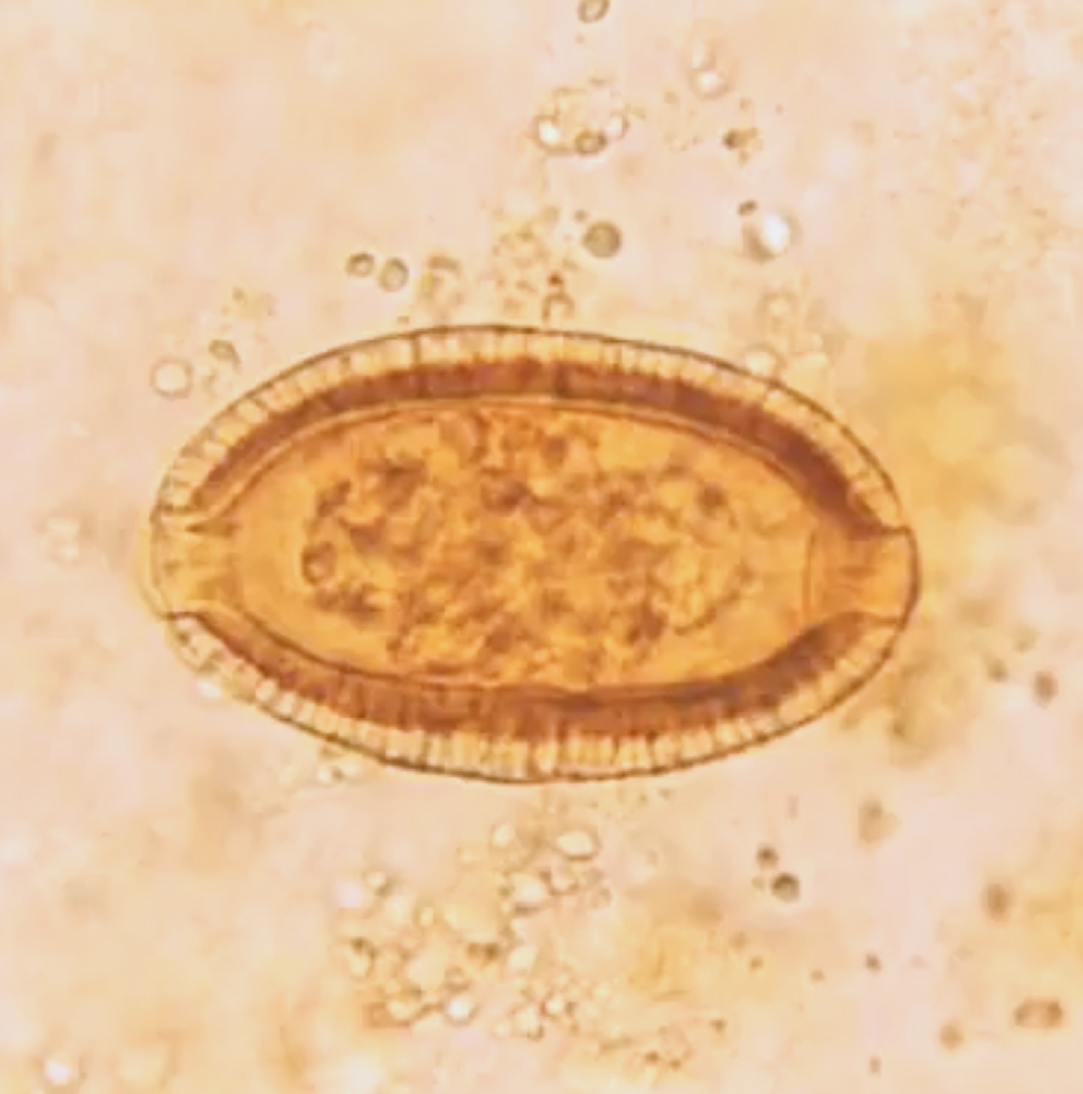
- Capillaria philippinensis egg
- Specialty: Infectious diseases, helminthology

Intestinal capillariasis is a disease in the group of helminthiasis diseases caused by the nematode Capillaria philippinensis.

== Symptoms and signs ==
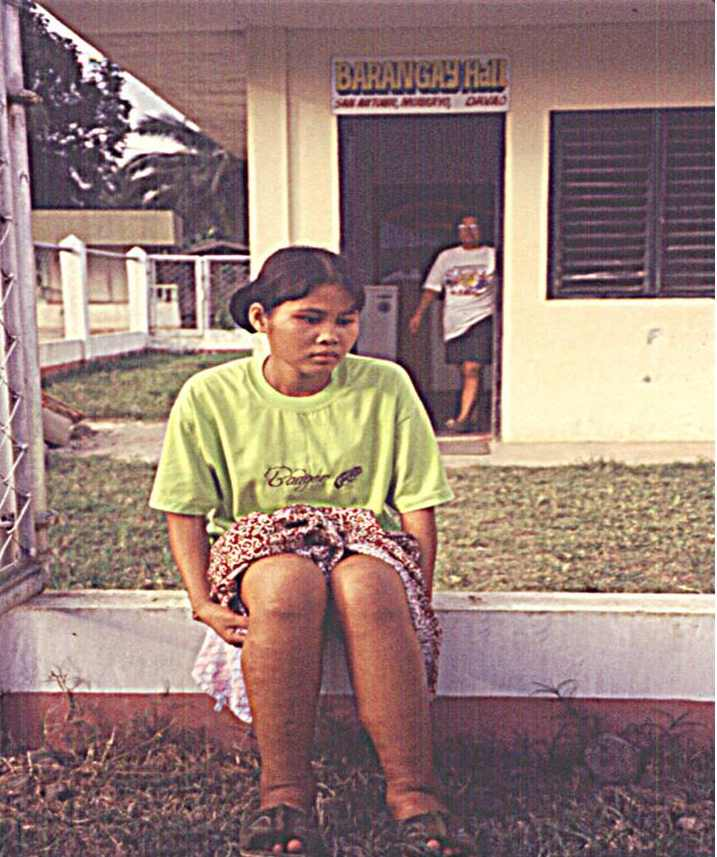
A 16-year-old girl with a 2-month history of diarrhea, anorexia, bipedal edema and borborygmi found to have Capillaria infection in the Philippines

Symptoms in infested humans include watery diarrhea, abdominal pain, edema, weight loss, borborygmus (stomach growling), and depressed levels of potassium and albumin in the blood. In humans, the parasites damage the cells of the intestinal wall. This damage interferes with the absorption of nutrients and the maintenance of a proper electrolyte balance. Untreated C. philippinensis infestations are often fatal.

== Diagnosis ==
Diagnosis usually involves finding the eggs and/or adults of C. philippinensis in stool samples.

== Prevention ==
Prevention is as simple as avoiding eating small, whole, uncooked fish. However, in C. philippinensis endemic areas, such dietary habits are common and have been practiced for many generations.

== Treatment ==
Anthelmintics such as mebendazole and albendazole have been reported to eliminate infestation of humans more effectively than thiabendazole.
