= Nematode infection in dogs =

Threadworm infections of dogs are frequent

Nematode infection in dogs - the infection (also infestation) of dogs with parasitic nemamotodes - are, along with tapeworm infections and infections with protozoa (giardiasis, neosporosis), frequent parasitoses in veterinary practice. Nematodes, as so-called endoparasites ("internal parasites"), colonize various internal organs - most of them the digestive tract - and the skin. To date, about 30 different species of nematode have been identified in domestic dogs; they are essentially also found in wild dog species. However, the majority of them often cause no or only minor symptoms of disease in adult animals. The infection therefore does not necessarily have to manifest itself in a worm disease (helminthosis). For most nematodes, an infection can be detected by examining the feces for eggs or larvae. Roundworm infection in dogs and the hookworm in dogs is of particular health significance in Central Europe, as they can also be transmitted to humans (zoonosis). Regular deworming can significantly reduce the frequency of infection and thus the risk of infection for humans and dogs.

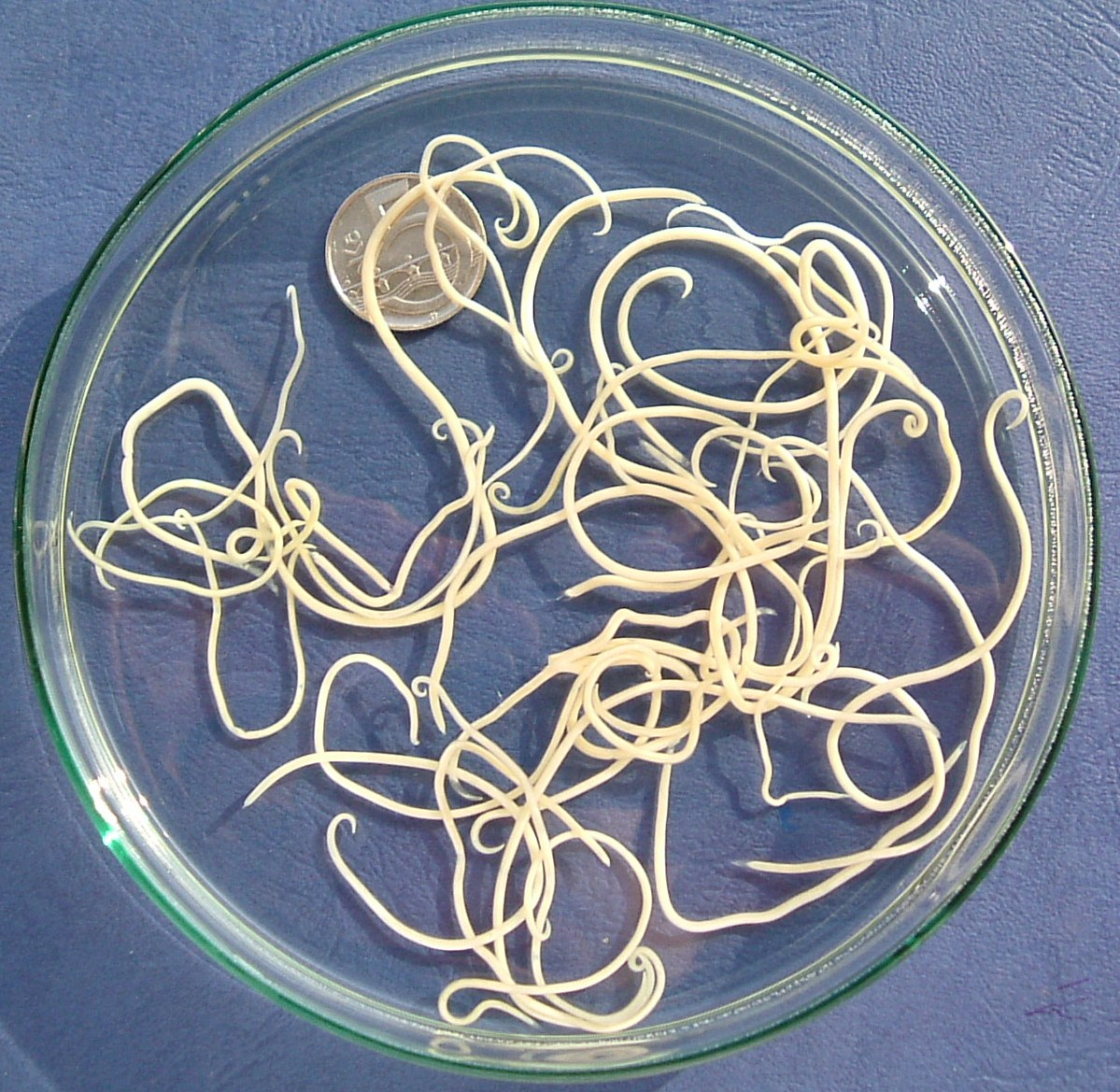
The canine roundworm Toxocara canis - a parasite that can also be transmitted to humans. For size comparison, a coin with a diameter of 23 mm.

== Parasitoses of the digestive tract ==
=== Roundworm infection ===
Two species of roundworms occur in dogs: Toxocara canis and Toxascaris leonina.

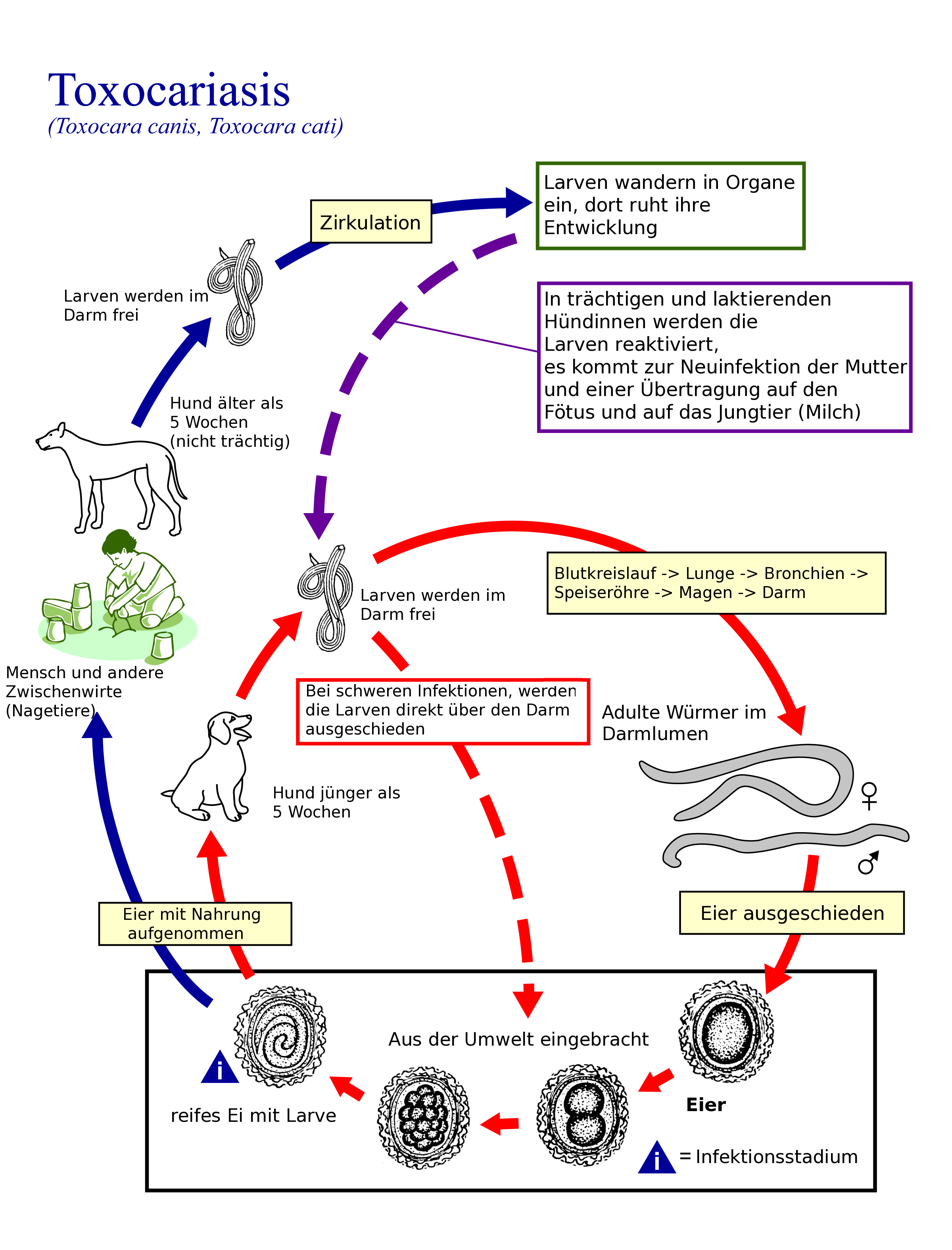
Life cycle of T. canis

T. canis is an 8 to 18 cm long nematode that parasitizes (lives as a parasite) in the small intestine. There, the adult females release approximately 85 μm large unfurrowed eggs, whose shell is thick and rough (golf ball-like) and which are released into the outside world via the feces. The period from infection to egg laying (prepatency) is three to six weeks, depending on the route of infection and the age of the dog. T. canis does not require an intermediate host for development, but infection of dogs can occur via collective hosts such as rodents and birds. In collective hosts (paratenic hosts), no complete development cycle of the parasites occurs, but infective stages can accumulate in them through multiple infections. In principle, three routes of infection are possible for T. canis: peroral infection and transplacental and galactogenic infection, which are much more common in puppies.

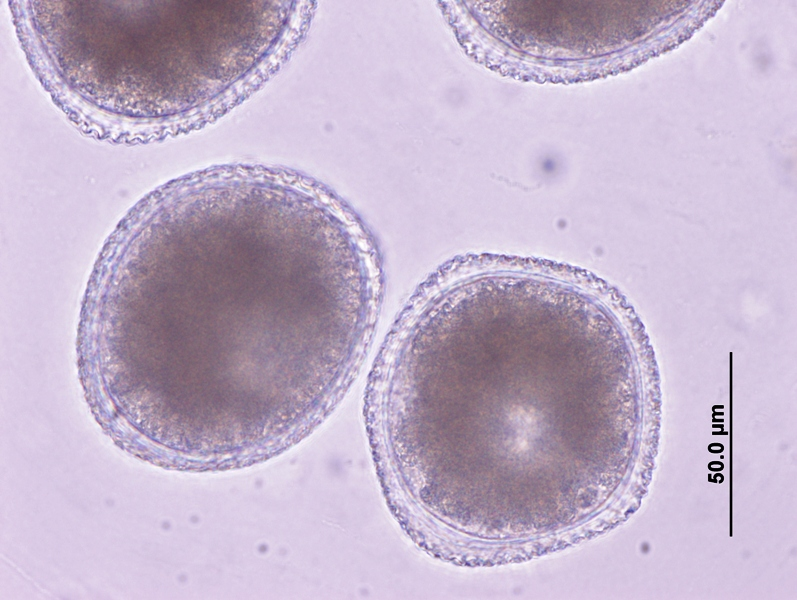
T. canis eggs

- Peroral infection (infection via the mouth) occurs through ingestion of eggs from the environment or larvae from collective hosts. The worm eggs are not infectious in the outside world until about two weeks after excretion in the feces. During this time, the second larval stage (larva L2) develops within the egg case, which - like larvae from collective hosts - is released during digestion in the small intestine of the new host. These larvae pierce the intestinal wall and enter the liver via the portal vein, where development to larva L3 takes place. Via the bloodstream, this migrates to the lungs, where it is coughed up and swallowed again. Only now do the larvae molt into adult worms. During their body migration, the larvae can also reach other organs, especially the skeletal muscles, where they cause tissue destruction. However, they often form persistent stages (stages in which the larvae persist in the tissue) in the tissue, which are important for the other two routes of infection.
- In transplacental infection (infection via the placenta), persistent larvae L3 migrate from the uterus through the placenta and infect the unborn pups while they are still in the womb.
- Galactogenic infection (infection via the mother's milk) of puppies occurs by excretion of roundworm larvae persisting in the mammary gland via the mother's milk during the suckling period.

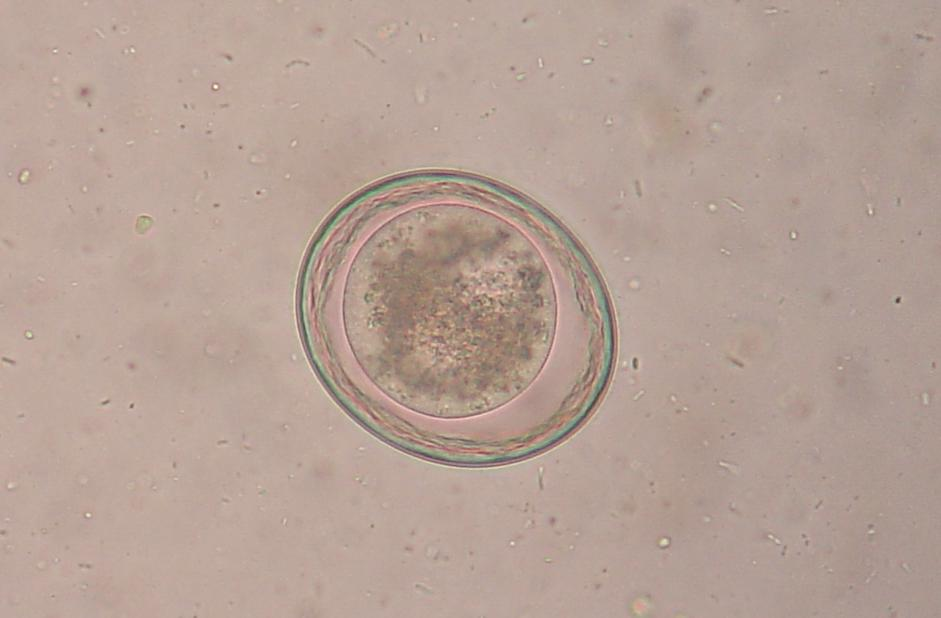
T. leonina egg

T. leonina is 6 to 10 cm long, the eggs are about 80 μm in size and thick-shelled. Unlike the eggs of T. canis, they have a smooth surface. Infection occurs perorally by ingestion of eggs from contaminated (polluted) food or via collective hosts such as rodents, birds, reptiles, or arthropods. The prepatency is 7 to 10 weeks.

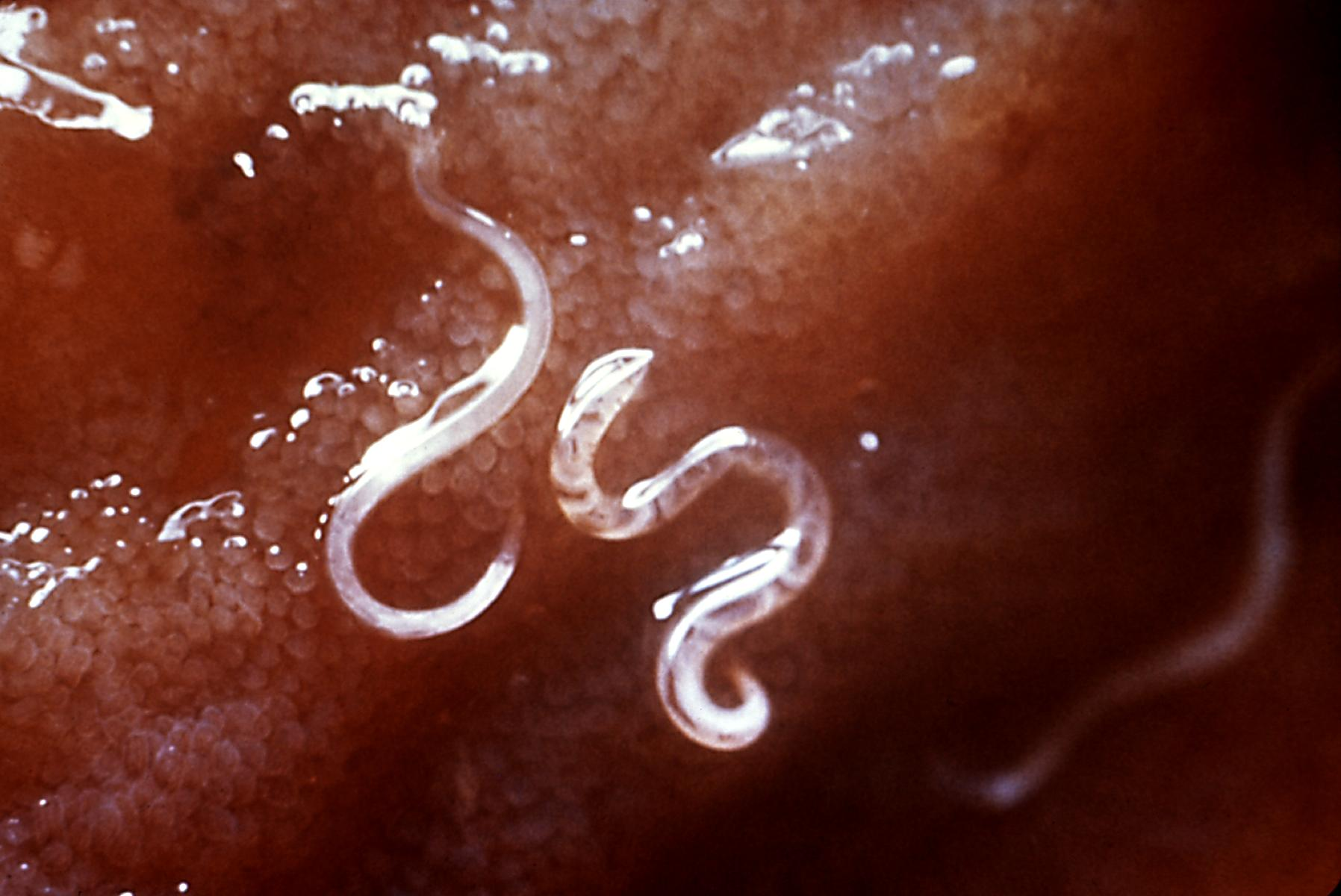
A. caninum on the intestinal mucosa

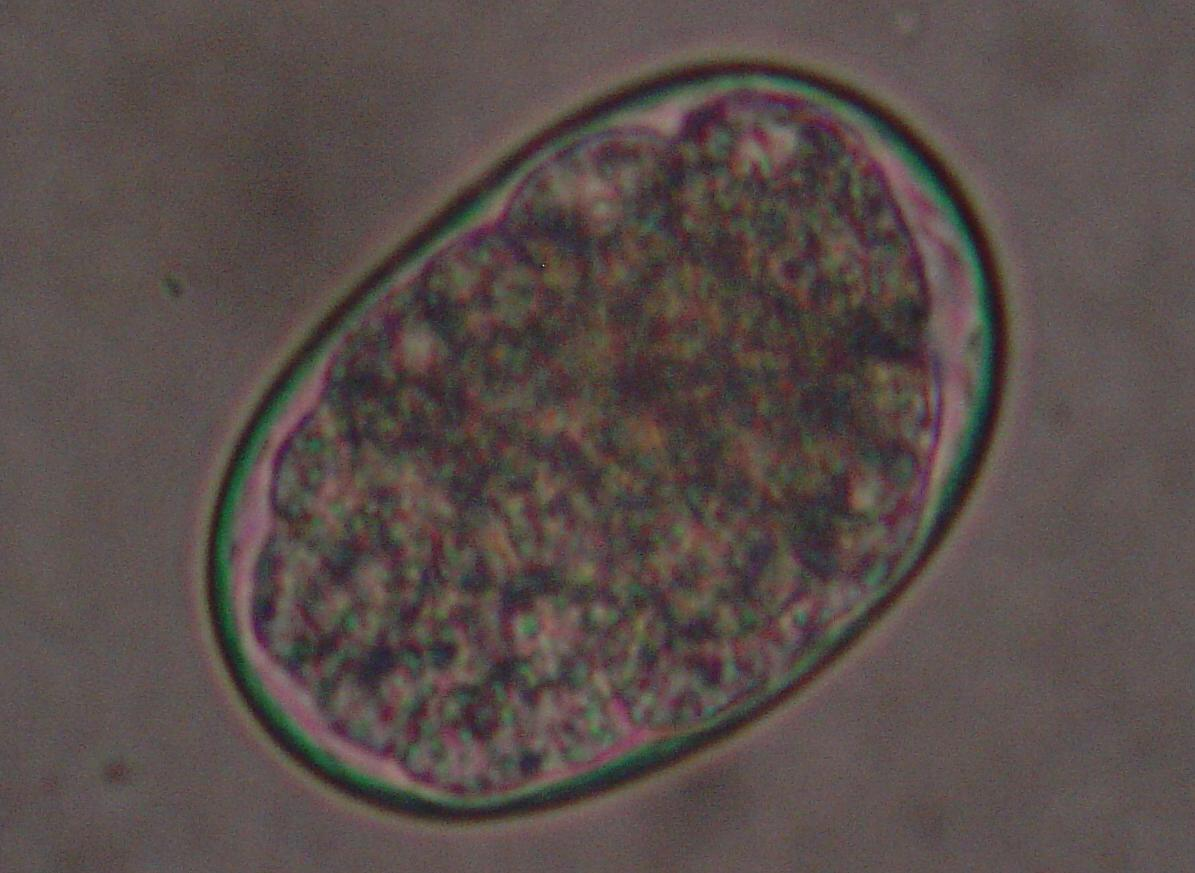
A. caninum egg

In a German study, T. canis was detected at a frequency (prevalence) of 22.4%, while T. leonina was detected in only 1.8% of domestic dogs. In Austria, T. canis was found to have a prevalence of 5.7%, while T. leonina had a prevalence of 0.6%. Both roundworms occur worldwide. A Czech study showed large differences in prevalence depending on living conditions: 6% of privately owned dogs in Prague, 6.5% of shelter dogs, and almost 14% of dogs from rural areas were infected with T. canis. In addition, an increase in prevalence has been shown in autumn. Domestic dogs in Belgium showed a mean prevalence of T. canis of 4.4%, those from larger kennels of up to 31%. In domestic dogs in Serbia, T. canis was detectable in 30% of the animals, in herding and hunting dogs in Greece in 12.8% and T. leonina in 0.7% of animals. In Canada, T. canis was found to have a prevalence of 3.9%, and in the northeastern U.S., 12.6%. In Australia, T. canis was detected in 38% of domestic dogs, and in animals within the first year of life, as many as 73%. In Brazil, T. canis could be detected in about 9% of domestic dogs, in Thailand in 7.4%. In Nigeria, T. canis was observed in a prevalence of 9%, T. leonina only in one of 0.6%, in Gabon 58.5% of domestic dogs were infected with T. canis. In wolves living in the temperate climate zone, however, T. leonina is the most common intestinal nematode (prevalence 74%). Studies on red foxes in southern England showed a prevalence of 56% (T. canis) and 1.5% (T. leonina), in Denmark 59% and 0.6%, respectively. Foxes thus represent a natural reservoir of the pathogen.

While infection with T. leonina only very rarely causes clinical manifestations such as diarrhea, the disease-causing (pathogenic) effect of T. canis is much stronger. In puppies, a reduced general condition, shaggy coat, retardation in growth, alternating diarrhea and constipation, a distended abdomen ("worm belly") and anemia occur. Complications of T. canis infection, some of which are fatal, include intestinal obstruction due to worm clusters, small intestinal rupture, pneumonia, liver inflammation, or neurological manifestations due to stray migratory larvae in the central nervous system.

In the case of worms in vomit, the diagnosis can already be made without special examinations. A roundworm infection can be detected with relative certainty by microscopic detection of the eggs extracted from the feces by the flotation method, but only after the expiration of the prepatency period.

=== Hookworm infection (ankylostomyasis) ===
Two hookworm species are most common in dogs: Ancylostoma caninum and Uncinaria stenocephala. They parasitize in the small intestine and cause anemia and damage to the intestinal mucosa by sucking blood.[19] At about 5–15 mm, the worms are only about one-tenth the length of roundworms, have a hook-shaped angled front end (hence the name "hookworm") and a large mouth capsule with cutting plates.

Females of A. caninum release eggs about 65×40 μm in size, which already have 4-10 furrowing stages at deposition. They are oval and thin-shelled and enter the outside world via feces. The prepatency is two to four weeks. The larvae released from the eggs can bore through the skin into a new host (percutaneous infection) or be ingested perorally - mostly via collective hosts such as rodents. As with T. canis, infection of puppies is also possible through the mother's milk (galactogenic infection). Larvae dormant in the mammary gland can be shed over a period of up to three suckling periods after a bitch has been infected once.

The eggs of U. stenocephala are similar to those of A. caninum, but have a larger longitudinal axis of 85×45 μm. Infection occurs exclusively by peroral ingestion of larvae via contaminated food or collective hosts.

In Germany, an infection frequency of 8.6% was determined, in Austria of 0.1% for A. caninum and 0.2% for U. stenocephala. A Czech study determined a prevalence of 0.4% each for both hookworms, a Greek one of 2.8% together. In studies of domestic dogs in Serbia and Nigeria, hookworms were detectable in a quarter of the domestic dogs examined, but U. stenocephala was detectable in only 0.4% of animals. In Gabon, both hookworms were detectable in 35% of domestic dogs. In Canada, A. caninum was detected in only 1.3% of domestic dogs, but in the northeastern U.S. it was detected in 12%. In fact, in a Brazilian study (37.8% of domestic dogs) and a Thai study (58.1% of domestic dogs) A. caninum was the most common nematode of all. In Australia, a prevalence of 26% was found for U. stenocephala. In contrast, in wolves that inhabit tundras, U. stenocephala is the most common intestinal nematode (prevalence 45%). In red foxes, this parasite is also very common, with a prevalence of 68%.

While infection with U. stenocephala often causes only minor symptoms such as diarrhea, infection with A. caninum can cause severe clinical pictures, especially in puppies. Bloody diarrhea, severe lassitude and anemia may occur, sometimes with an acute or peracute course and sudden death. In chronic course, the young animals are retarded in growth, are apathetic, show lack of appetite, diarrhea and emaciation. Rather rarely, pneumonia occurs due to migrating larvae. Hookworm infection can be diagnosed by detecting the eggs in the feces using a flotation method.

=== Whipworm infestation (trichuriasis) ===
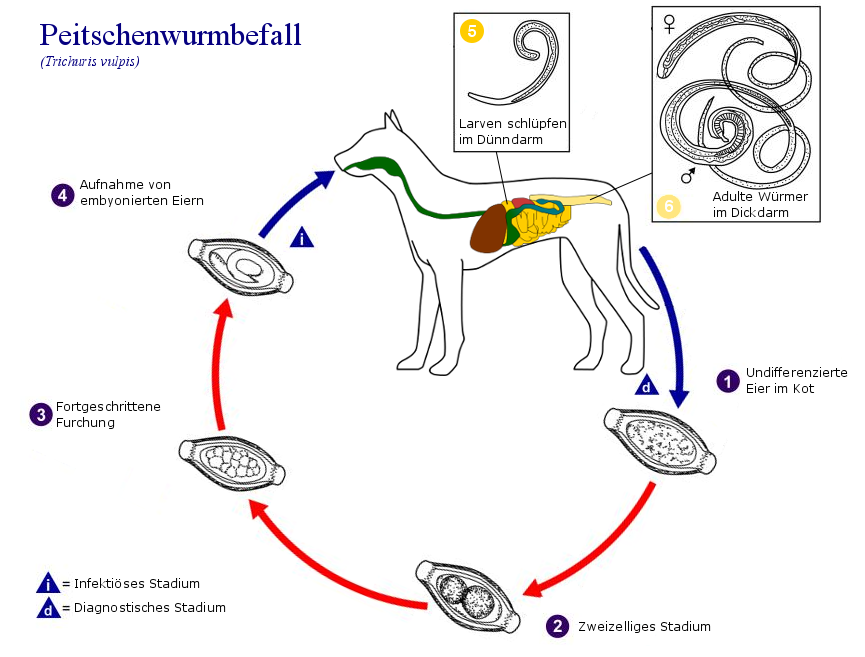
Life cycle of T. vulpis

The most common whipworm of the dog is Trichuris vulpis. It is 4–8 cm long, has a long thin front end and a thickened rear end. The eggs are lemon-shaped, 80×40 μm in size, brownish, thick-shelled, and have thickening at the poles ("pole pads"). They are unfurled when the eggs are laid. Infection occurs by ingestion of eggs embryonating (containing a larva) in the external environment. The prepatency is relatively long, 9–10 weeks. T. vulpis parasitizes in the appendix and colon.

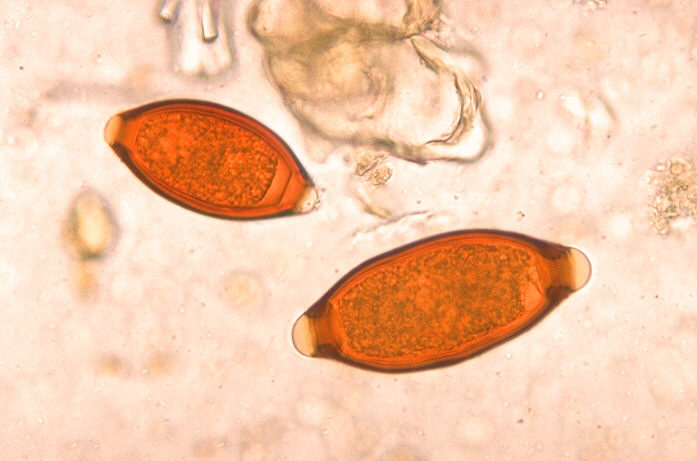
Eggs of T. trichiura (left) and T. vulpis (right).

T. vulpis is distributed worldwide. In Germany, about 4% of domestic dogs are infested, and in Austria, 3.1%. In the Czech Republic, a prevalence of about 1% was determined, and in Greece, 9.6%. In contrast, in a study of domestic dogs in Serbia, T. vulpis was the most common intestinal parasite and was detectable in 47% of the animals examined. In the northeastern U.S., 15% of domestic dogs were infested.[10] In Nigeria, it was detected in only 0.5% of animals in one study, but was significantly more common in another study, and in Gabon, 50% of domestic dogs were infected. In Brazil, the frequency of infection was 7%, and in Thailand, 20.5%. In Australia, T. vulpis was the most common nematode in adult dogs, with a prevalence of 41%. In red foxes, the frequency of infestation is 0.5%.

The disease-causing effect of T. vulpis is moderate. Infected dogs show diarrhea that is bloody, in less severe cases interspersed with mucus. The animals become emaciated, young animals are retarded in growth, and anemia may develop in severely infested dogs. A definite diagnosis can only be made by detection in the feces by means of flotation procedures.

=== Dwarf nematode infection (strongyloidiasis) ===
Infection with the dwarf nematode Strongyloides canis can occur by ingestion of infectious larvae via the mother's milk, peroral ingestion or by active penetration of the larvae through the skin. Autoinfection, i.e., infection of the same animal by larvae excreted by it, is possible. S. canis parasitizes in the small intestine. The eggs are about 50 μm long and already contain the infective larva when excreted with the feces. A prevalence of 1.8% has been determined in Greek herding and hunting dogs, and 2% in domestic dogs in Thailand.

Strongyloidiasis causes acute to chronic diarrhea in puppies, with occasional constipation. Diagnosis can be made by detecting the eggs in feces using flotation techniques.

=== Stomach worm infection ===
Gastric worms (Physaloptera spp.) belong to a worldwide distributed genus of nematodes that can infest the mucosa of the stomach and duodenum. Male worms are up to 30 mm long, females up to 40 mm long. The eggs are oval, thick-shelled, 55 × 32 μm in size, and already contain a larva. The larvae form cysts in various insects - beetles, cockroaches, and crickets in particular are intermediate hosts. Mice and frogs can also infect the dog as collective hosts. The larvae hatch in the stomach, attach directly to the mucosa, and molt into adults (sexually mature worms).

The stomach worms cause damage to the gastric mucosa, leading to gastritis, bleeding and chronic vomiting. In severe infection, weight loss and anemia occur. Detection of the eggs in feces by the flotation method is uncertain, as they hardly float up. Therefore, there are no systematic studies on the frequency of occurrence. A definite diagnosis can be made using gastric lavage samples or gastroscopy.

=== Esophageal worm infection ===
The esophageal worm (Spirocerca lupi) is a bright red worm that causes nodules in the esophageal wall. Male worms measure about 40 mm, and female worms are about 70 mm long. Infection occurs perorally via intermediate hosts (various dung beetles) or via paratenic hosts such as chickens, reptiles, and rodents infected by eating the beetles. The larva migrates through the wall of the aorta, where it remains for about three months, and from there into the esophageal wall, where it develops into the adult worm. The prepatency is five to six months. The eggs are cylindrical in shape, have rounded caps, a thin, smooth wall, and measure 30-37 × 11-15 μm. At the time of shedding, they already contain the larva.

The infection is common in the southern United States and in tropical countries. In Gabon, the parasite could be detected in a quarter of domestic dogs.

The worms can occasionally cause an aortic aneurysm during their migration, but often infested dogs are asymptomatic. In the esophagus itself, S. lupi causes a granulomatous tissue reaction, which without treatment very often degenerates and then forms various malignant tumors. In addition to squamous cell carcinomas and fibrosarcomas, the esophageal cells can also degenerate into osteosarcomas. The tumor-induced space-occupying lesion in the thorax can also lead to hypertrophic osteopathy.

Infection is diagnosed by endoscopy. This shows a mass in the esophagus with parasites at the wart-like openings. The diagnosis can be confirmed by the detection of embryonated eggs in the feces.

=== Liver hairworm infection ===
The liver hairworm Capillaria hepatica is found primarily in rodents and lagomorphs; infections of dogs are rare. Infection occurs by eating the liver of a rodent. Clinically, symptoms such as abdominal discomfort and hepatomegalia occur as the larvae migrate through the liver and lay eggs. A definite diagnosis can only be made by liver biopsy.

== Parasitoses of the respiratory tract ==
=== Lung hairworm infection (capillariasis) ===
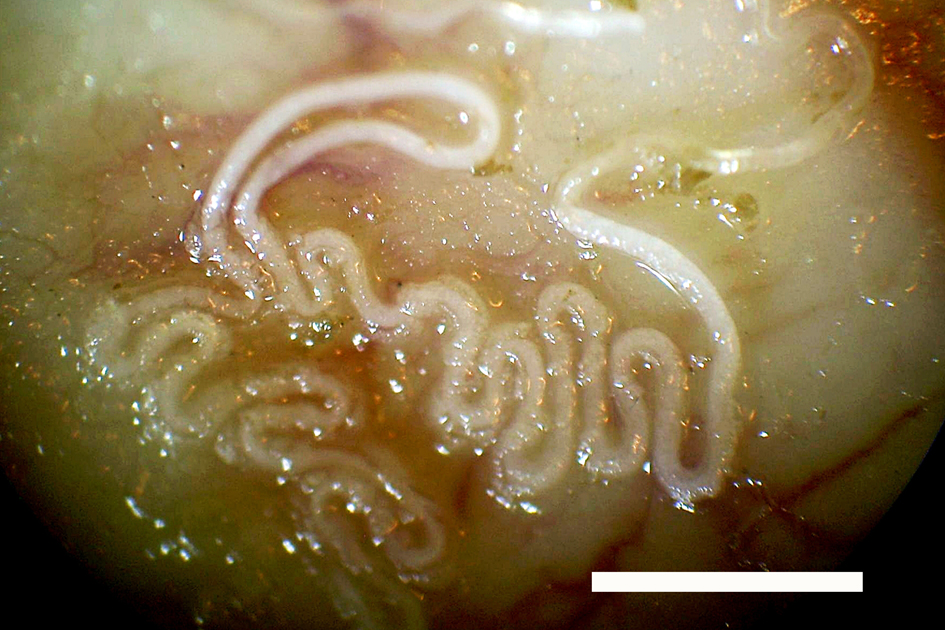
Lung hairworm in the trachea of a fox (bar = 1 mm).

The lung hairworm (Capillaria aerophila, Syn.: Eucoleus aerophilus) is up to 25 mm long and parasitizes in the lower airways. The eggs produced by the female worm have two polar pads and a colorless to greenish, granular shell. They enter the gastrointestinal tract through high coughing and swallowing and eventually enter the environment through feces. Infection occurs through ingestion of food or water contaminated with eggs. Larvae hatch in the intestine and enter the lungs through the bloodstream. The prepatency is about 40 days.

In Germany, the prevalence of infection in domestic dogs was found to be 2.3%, in Austria 0.2%, in the Czech Republic 0.6%, and in Canada 0.3%. In red foxes in southern England, C. aerophila was found to have a prevalence of 0.2%, whereas in Denmark it was 74%, making lung hairworms one of the most prevalent nematodes, and foxes a significant natural reservoir of pathogens for infecting dogs. Other predators such as wolves, tanuki, marten-like animals, lynxes, and cats are also infested.

Infestation with lung hairworm rarely causes clinical symptoms such as coughing, sneezing and nasal discharge. However, secondary bacterial infection can result in fatal bronchopneumonia. Diagnosis can be made by fecal examination using a flotation method to detect eggs or by lung biopsy.

=== Lungworm infection ===
The lungworm Crenosoma vulpis is up to 1.6 cm long and is transmitted indirectly by eating intermediate hosts such as snails. It colonizes the trachea and bronchi. The main host is the red fox, but dogs, tanuki, wolves, and coyotes are also infested.

C. vulpis has been detected in about 1% of domestic dogs in Germany, and in dogs with pulmonary symptoms in 2.4 to 6% of animals. In Canada, an infection rate of 3.2% has been determined. In red foxes in Denmark, a prevalence of 17% has been determined, and in North America, infection rates range from 25 to 50% - thus, the red fox can be considered a natural primary host.

Clinically, infection is characterized by chronic cough and resembles allergic bronchitis.

Detection of C. vulpis in fecal samples using standard flotation procedures is relatively uncertain, with only 28.5% of fecal samples positive using the larval outmigration procedure also yielding a positive result using the standard procedure.

=== Filaroididae ===
Filaroididae are a group of nematodes that parasitize in the lungs and trachea. The most common species are Oslerus osleri (syn. Filaroides osleri), which parasitizes in the trachea - especially in the area of the tracheal bifurcation (bifurcatio tracheae) - (oslerosis) and Filaroides hirthi, which infects the lung tissue (filaroidosis). Male O. osleri grow to about 6–7 mm, females 10 to 13 mm. Eggs measure 80-120 × 60-70 μm, and larva L1 is about 250 μm long. F. hirthi is 2–3 mm (male) or 7–13 mm (female), and larva L1 is 240-290 μm long. Andersonstrongylus milksi (syn. Filaroides milksi) is a rare member of the Filaroididae in dogs and is largely similar to Filaroides hirthi in appearance, life cycle, and clinical presentation.

The parasites cause small nodules in the area of the bifurcation of the trachea or in the lung tissue; dead worms can also cause larger granulomas. The female worms lay eggs, which hatch into larvae that develop into the adult worm over five molts. Infection occurs either through eggs or the first larva, usually through direct contact with saliva, nasal secretions, or regurgitated stomach contents when the mother feeds the puppies. Infection via coprophagia is possible but rare. Self-infection of infested animals is also possible because the worms do not require an intermediate host. During infection, the larva migrates from the intestine via blood or lymphatic vessels into the bloodstream, from where it enters the lungs or tracheal wall and develops into the adult worm. The prepatency for O. osleri is ten weeks, and for F. hirthi five weeks.

The members of the Filaroididae occur worldwide. O. osleri is most common in foxes and other wild canines; infections of domestic dogs are rare. F. hirthi was first observed in beagle breed dogs in the United States, but now occurs worldwide and in other dog breeds, but especially in beagles kept as laboratory dogs.

Infection with O. osleri causes chronic inflammation of the trachea and bronchi with a severe dry cough and abnormal breath sounds on inspiration. The disease usually does not manifest until the end of the first year of life and does not respond to antibiotic treatment. The simultaneous appearance of similar symptoms in the mother and her puppies is an indication of such an infection. Occasionally, seizure-like dyspnea may occur on exertion. For the most part, fever does not occur.

Detection of nodules by means of pulmonary endoscopy, possibly also on chest radiographs, and of larvae in lung lavage fluid or tracheal swabs can be used for diagnosis. Detection of larvae in feces by flotation methods is uncertain, especially since larvae are excreted only irregularly in feces, and not at all during the relatively long prepatency.

== Parasitoses of the bloodstream ==
=== Heartworm infestation (dirofilariosis) ===
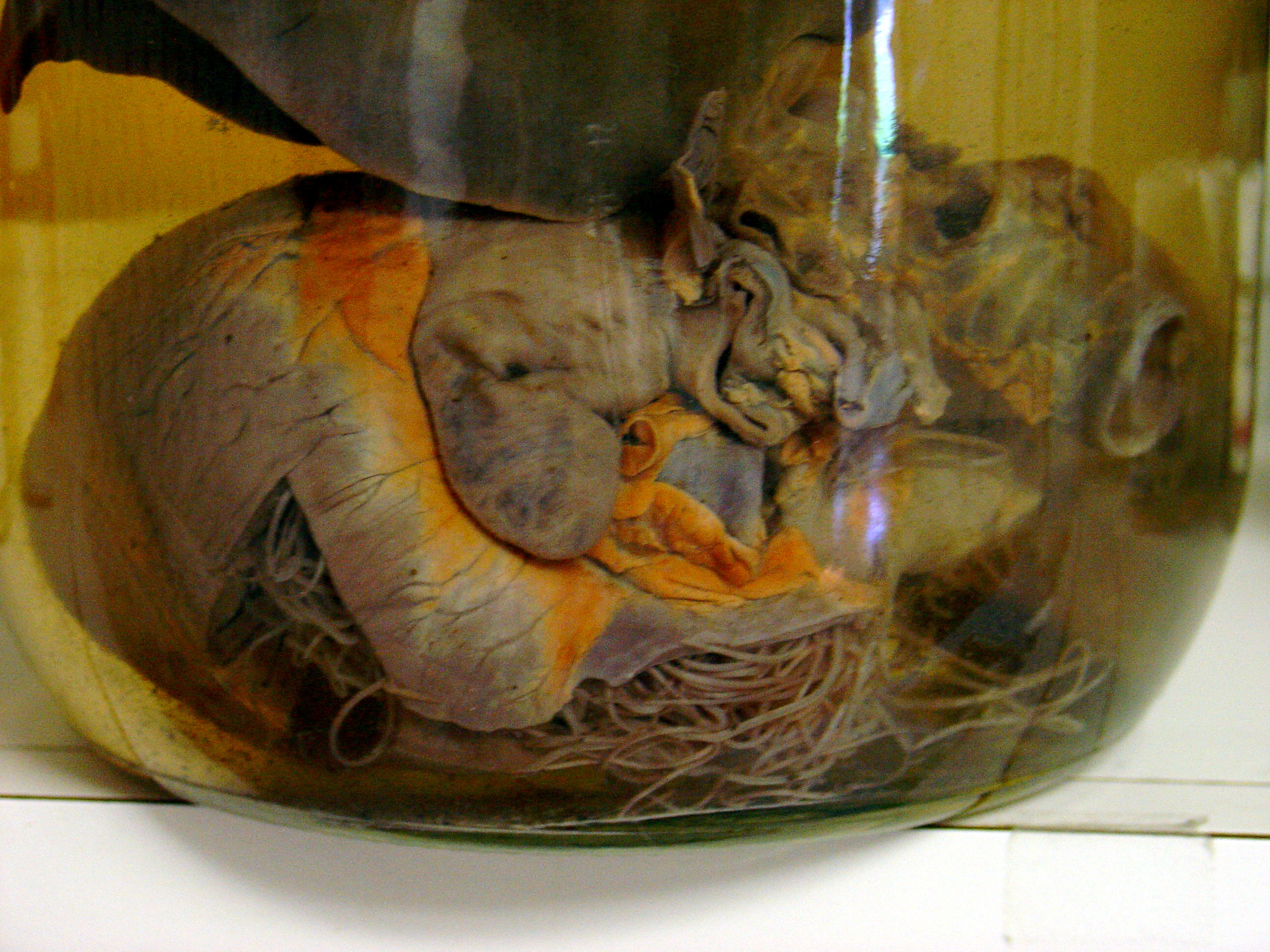
Dog heart with heartworms

The causative agent of the disease is Dirofilaria immitis, a nematode 1 mm thick and 20–30 cm long. It requires an intermediate host for its development; part of the development cycle - from the larval stage L1 to L3 (microfilariae) - takes place in mosquitoes. Transmission to the dog occurs during the sucking act. In the subcutis, the larva L4 develops, which enters the bloodstream where it sheds its skin to become the adult worms. The adult heartworms colonize the right half of the heart, the pulmonary vascular trunk and the sections of the vena cava close to the heart. Only about six months after infection do the females in turn produce microfilariae (larva L1), which enter smaller blood vessels with the blood and are again ingested by mosquitoes during the act of sucking. The microfilariae are then ingested by mosquitoes.

To date, over 70 species of mosquitoes have been identified as vectors, although none are native to Central Europe. In Turkey, 26% of domestic dogs have antibodies to D. immitis (seroprevalence). In the southern states of the U.S., seroprevalence is 4%, and in the northern states it is 1%. In the Australian state of Victoria, antibodies to D. immitis have been detected in 8% of dogs over two years of age, and in South Korea, seroprevalence is approximately 40%. The number of dogs infected with D. immitis has been reported in the past.

Infected animals show reduced performance with the development of the mature worms, i.e. only about six months after infection, and tire quickly. Right heart failure develops with congestion and dilatation of the right side of the heart (cor pulmonale), which manifests itself in shortness of breath, coughing and the formation of edema. Liver and kidney failure may also develop as a result of heart failure.

For diagnosis, the serological detection of D. immitis antigen is preferably used, which is highly specific and sensitive. In addition, microscopic detection of microfilariae is possible by blood examination with enrichment or occasionally by simple blood smear. However, these detections are limited to the phases when microfilariae are truly present in greater numbers in the blood, and are therefore considered to be of low sensitivity due to many false-negative findings.

=== Angiostrongylosis ===
The French heartworm (Angiostrongylus vasorum) is a parasite of the pulmonary vascular trunk, pulmonary arteries and right ventricle. The very thin (170-360 μm), pink worms grow to 1.4 to 2 cm in length. Prepatency varies from 35 to 60 days. The main end host of the parasite is foxes, but dogs, wolves, coyotes, badgers, pampas foxes, Brazilian fighting foxes, crab foxes and lesser pandas are also infested. Originally, the parasite was mainly widespread in France, Denmark and Great Britain. Worldwide, the frequency of infection has been increasing significantly for several years, with endemic foci also in the United States, South America, Australia, and the Asian part of Russia. Recent figures show an infection frequency in Germany of 7.4% in animals with pulmonary disease or 0.5% of the total dog population.

Female worms lay undifferentiated eggs that enter the pulmonary capillaries via the bloodstream, where larvae L1 hatch and migrate to the lower airways. The larvae are coughed up, swallowed, and excreted in the feces. The duration of excretion (patency) is up to five years. In intermediate hosts (various snail species), they develop into the infective larva L3. After ingestion, the larvae penetrate the intestinal wall and develop further in the lymph nodes of the abdominal cavity. They then enter the right ventricle and pulmonary arteries by the bloodstream, where they molt into adult worms.

The larvae reach the pulmonary arteries ten days after peroral infection and cause severe pulmonary changes and coagulopathy to occur. Occasionally, the worms and larvae also migrate to other organs (larva migrans).

Clinically, affected dogs show a slowly progressive reduction in cardiac and/or pulmonary function. Chronic cough, respiratory distress, food refusal and weight loss, diarrhea, central nervous signs, and tissue hemorrhage are also common symptoms. Diagnosis is made by detection of larva L1 in feces using larval emigration procedures. The time-consuming larval emigration procedure can be replaced by serological (sandwich ELISA) or PCR detection. A rapid test (IDEXX Angio Detect) is available for serological detection.

== Parasitoses of the urinary organs ==
=== Giant kidney worm infection ===
The giant kidney worm (Dioctophyme renale; syn. Dioctophyma renale) is the largest known parasitic nematode and can infest the kidney and occasionally the abdominal cavity in dogs. Female worms reach lengths of over one meter by up to 12 mm in diameter; male worms measure 20 cm by 6–8 mm. Both sexes are blood red in color. The parasite is distributed worldwide, but is rare in Europe. It is not restricted to the dog as the final host, but can infect most mammals (including humans). Reproduction and egg excretion can only occur if the same kidney is infested by both a female and a male worm and the worms have already perforated the renal pelvis. Eggs are excreted in the urine via the renal pelvis. These eggs are oval to cylindrical, yellow-brown, thick-walled, with a rough, knobbed surface, and 71-84 × 45-52 μm in size. The eggs embryonate within two weeks to three months, depending on the ambient temperature, and then become infectious to intermediate hosts.

Infection occurs through consumption of intermediate or paratenic hosts, which contain cysts with larvae of the parasite. Intermediate hosts are earthworms and aquatic oligochaeta, in which larva L1 hatches and develops to larva L3; paratenic hosts are freshwater fish or frogs, in which larva L3 encapsulates in muscle flesh. The larva is released from its cyst in the digestive tract of the final host, penetrates the intestinal wall, and migrates to the liver for about 50 days. Subsequently, it penetrates directly through the abdominal cavity into the kidney, where it develops into the adult worm. The right kidney is more frequently affected than the left. In dogs, however, the parasite quite often remains in the abdominal cavity, which has less serious consequences for the dog than an infection of the kidney. The infected kidney is slowly destroyed by the parasite, which usually also perforates the renal pelvis in the process. Since eggs in the urine occur very rarely, their detection is unsuitable for diagnosis. Kidney worm infection can be detected by sonography.

=== Urinary bladder hairworm infection ===
The urinary bladder hairworm Capillaria plica is 13 to 60 mm long and colonizes the urinary bladder, occasionally the ureter and renal pelvis. The eggs are 63-68 × 24-27 μm, capped, and have a slightly roughened shell. They are excreted in the urine. Earthworms serve as intermediate hosts, in which the infective larva L1 develops. Infection occurs by ingestion of the intermediate hosts or indirectly via collective hosts.

In domestic dogs in larger kennels, up to three quarters of the animals may be infested. In red foxes in Denmark, a prevalence of 80% was found, making urinary bladder hairworms the most abundant nematode, and foxes a significant natural reservoir of pathogens for infecting dogs.

C. plica rarely causes symptoms of disease. In more severe infections, urinary bladder inflammation with urinary urgency and urinary incontinence may occur. Diagnosis can be made by detection in urine, but not in animals younger than eight months due to long prepatency.

== Parasitoses of the skin ==
=== Peloderose ===
Pelodera strongyloides (syn. Rhabditis strongyloides) is a normally free-living nematode that occurs worldwide in moist, decaying organic material and whose larva L3 occasionally infects the skin of dogs. Infection occurs through direct contact with larvae-containing material in moist and soiled bedding (for example, when moist straw is used as bedding). It is unclear whether the larvae can penetrate healthy skin; in any case, pre-existing skin diseases and moist conditions that soften the skin favor infection. The larvae parasitize in the hair follicles and the upper layers of the dermis.

Lesions are usually confined to those parts of the skin that have been in direct contact with the infectious material, most commonly the abdomen, lower chest, and extremities. The affected skin is reddened, moderately to severely inflamed, and partially to completely hairless. There is marked itching, which can lead to further skin lesions (crusting) and secondary bacterial infections. Usually the disease is self-limiting, partly because the dog is a false host for the worms. Diagnosis is made by skin scraping, in which the larvae, measuring about 600×38 μm, can be easily identified with a microscope.

=== Dracunculosis ===
Dracunculus insignis is a nematode found primarily in North America, with raccoons as its primary host. The medina worm (D. medinensis) is found in Asia and Africa and infects numerous mammals including humans. Both parasites are occasionally found in domestic dogs in these areas. Infection occurs perorally by ingestion of water containing cyclops, which serve as intermediate hosts, or indirectly by ingestion of aggregate hosts such as frogs. The larvae are released during digestion and bore through the intestinal wall. Female worms migrate to the subcutis after mating. Here they form painful and sometimes fistulous pseudocysts that burst on contact with water and release the larvae, which are about 0.5 mm long. Diagnosis can be made by detecting the larvae or the female worms in such cysts.

=== Cutaneous dirofilariasis ===
Dirofilaria repens is a parasite of the subcutaneous tissue in dogs. Mosquitoes act as intermediate hosts and vectors. It occurs mainly in southern, southern eastern and western Europe as well as in large parts of Asia, but is spreading further and further into northern Europe and is increasingly detected in Germany as well.

Infestation with D. repens occasionally causes skin nodules, swelling, itching, abscesses, and hair loss, but often progresses completely without clinical symptoms. The acid phosphatase reaction can be used for diagnosis.

=== Rare filariases ===
Acanthocheilonema reconditum (syn. Dipetalonema reconditum) occurs in the US and southern Europe. infection rates are 16.5% in southern Italy and up to 8% in Greece. Cat and dog fleas serve as vectors. The worms parasitize primarily in the subcutis, with a small proportion of parasites also found in internal organs.

Cercopithifilaria grassi (syn. Dipetalonema grassi, Acanthocheilonema grassi) occurs in southern Europe, in Greece about 1% of dogs are infested. The carrier is the brown dog tick. The larvae (microfilariae) parasitize in the skin.

Dipetalonema dracunculoides (syn. Acanthocheilonema dracunculoides) occurs in Africa and Spain. In Africa, louse flies are the main vectors; in Spain, where the prevalence is 1.5%, the brown dog tick is the vector. The prepatency is 2–3 months.

== Parasitoses of the eyes ==
=== Thelaziose ===
Thelaziosis is caused by members of the genus Thelazia. They are whitish nematodes about 1.5 cm long. Thelazia callipeda is particularly widespread in the Far East (Japan, China, Korea, India and Russia), but is also a frequent pathogen of eye diseases in some regions of Italy with infestation rates of up to 60%. In Switzerland and France, individual cases have been increasing recently. In Germany, four cases have been documented so far, three of them after a stay in Italy. Thelazia californiensis is widespread in California. The biology of these nematodes has not been definitively clarified; flies are suspected as vectors, whi ch ingest the larva L1 and in which development up to the infective larva L3 takes place.

Thelazia parasitize on the eyeball under the nictitating membrane as well as in the lacrimal ducts and cause conjunctivitis and increased lacrimation. Obstruction of the lacrimal ducts or corneal inflammation may also occur. In case of heavy infection, the worms are already visible to the naked eye. A definite diagnosis can be made by detecting the worms or their larvae in eyewash samples or a biopsy of the lacrimal gland.

=== Onchocerciasis ===
The causative agent of canine onchocerciasis is Onchocerca lupi. The disease occurs in North America and some European countries (Greece, Hungary), but is rare - 64 cases have been described to date. The worms cause pea- to bean-sized granulomatous nodules in the sclera, ocular periphery, and conjunctiva. In some circumstances, lymphoplasmacytic inflammation of the medial ocular sclera may develop. Diagnosis can be made by detecting the worms in the nodules.

== Other parasitoses ==
=== Trichinella infection (trichinellosis) ===
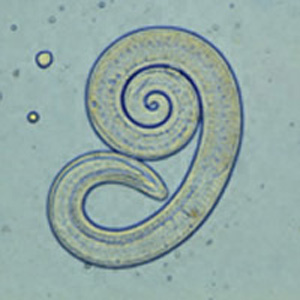
Trichinella spiralis

Trichinae (Trichinella spp.) are a genus of nematodes whose larvae migrate into skeletal muscle. Trichinae have no external phase; infection occurs through the consumption of raw muscle meat from an infested animal. In Europe, Trichinella spiralis is most common in domestic animals; Trichinella britovi and Trichinella nativa are also found in dogs.

In the intestine, the muscle meat and cyst capsules are digested, releasing the larvae, which penetrate the mucosa of the duodenum and jejunum. There they develop into adult trichinae within about four days. After mating, the female worms bore deeper into the mucosa and lay up to 1500 eggs per individual over four to 16 weeks. The hatched larvae are about 100 microns long. They migrate first into the lymphatic vessels and then via the portal vein into the peripheral vascular system. Once they reach the musculature in the process, they leave the blood vessel and bore into a single muscle fiber. There they grow rapidly to a length of 1 mm, encapsulate and begin to take on the typical curled shape. Capsule formation in muscle tissue begins about 15 days after infection and is complete after four to eight weeks - the host's flesh is then infectious. Larvae can remain infectious in the muscles of a host for years; they are most commonly found in the diaphragm, tongue, masseter muscles, and intercostal muscles.

Little data exist on the frequency of Trichinella infection in dogs. In Finland, which has a very high prevalence of Trichinella in wildlife, dogs were serologically found to have an infection frequency between 4.9% and 8.6%. However, in the same study, cysts were detected in the muscle of only one of 102 dogs. In China, where dogs are slaughtered for human consumption, trichinae were detected in an average of 16.2% of slaughtered dogs during trichinae inspection, with prevalence varying from 1.2% to 44.8% depending on the region.

=== Raccoon roundworm infection ===
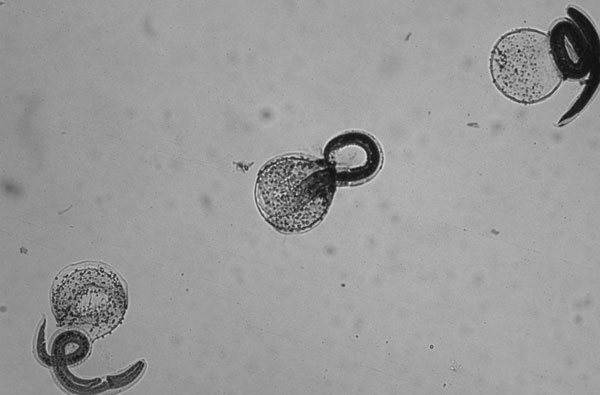
Freshly hatched larvae of the raccoon roundworm

The raccoon roundworm (Baylisascaris procyonis) is a relative of the roundworm in dogs (Toxocara canis, see above), which specializes in the raccoon as the final host. In Germany, 70% of all raccoons are infected with the parasite. Infections of the dog as the final host and egg excretor are known from the US, tend to be increasing in frequency and represent a considerable zoonotic risk. Clinically more serious, however, is infection of the dog as an off-target host by ingestion of eggs. The larva of the raccoon roundworm very often migrates to the central nervous system of the offending host, where it causes severe neurological deficits that can be fatal.

== Combat ==
Most infections are rather harmless for adult dogs, as a pathogen-host balance is established when the immune system is intact. However, since some of them can cause health disorders and some also pose a potential danger to humans, regular worming treatments for dogs are quite sensible. In particular, dogs in larger holdings, young animals, dogs in contact with other animals, hunting dogs, strays, and animals fed raw meat products are at higher risk of infection. The European Scientific Counsel Companion Animal Parasites (ESCCAP) - the European association of experts on parasites in dogs and cats - has therefore issued recommendations for the control of worm infections. These are adapted to regional specifics by national veterinary societies. In the United States, there are also such guidelines, issued here by the Companion Animal Parasite Council (CAPC).

The recommendations, which were last adapted in July 2014 according to the ESCCAP guidelines for Germany, aim to protect dogs "(...) from infections with worms and their consequences through professional diagnostics, medication and prevention." Regular control is recommended especially for roundworms.

Since puppies can be infected with roundworms at birth, they should be dewormed every 14 days from two weeks of age until weaning. Nursing bitches should also be treated during the first puppy deworming. Only monthly deworming offers reliable protection against passing on roundworms. According to ESCCAP, a monthly rotation may be considered for dogs that have a lot of contact with other dogs, have regular unsupervised exercise, or have close contact in families with young children. In principle, however, an individual risk assessment should be carried out for each animal. If this is not possible or if infections cannot be excluded by diagnostic tests, deworming four times a year is recommended. For special events, e.g. a sports competition or an exhibition, the ESCCAP recommends deworming once about four weeks before and again two to four weeks after the event. For treatment against roundworms, drugs based on emodepside, fenbendazole, flubendazole, mebendazole, milbemycin oxime, moxidectin, pyrantel and selamectin are approved in Germany for domestic dogs. These drugs are broad-spectrum anthelmintics and also exert activity against most other nematodes found in dogs. No preparation is currently approved for the treatment of pregnant bitches, although experimental studies have shown that the use of selamectin or emodepside in pregnancy effectively prevents infection of unborn puppies.

Heartworm control in Germany only plays a role in dogs that are to be taken to endemic foreign countries (including southern and eastern European countries) or come from there. Moxidectin, milbemycinoxime, and selamectin are currently approved for therapy and prophylaxis of heartworm disease. In addition, protection with insect repellents such as permethrin or deltamethrin is recommended when traveling to heartworm endemic areas.

To minimize the infection pressure with worms in general, control of parasites in the environment is also important. Feces should be collected daily and disposed of in accordance with bio-hazardous waste disposal standards. Roundworm eggs, for example, are infectious in moist soil for up to four years, and whipworm eggs for over six years. These eggs have high tenacity, but are sensitive to prolonged temperatures above 35 °C and drought. Regular cleaning and disinfection measures are strongly recommended. Floors can be effectively cleaned with a steam cleaner at over 60 °C, care should be taken to ensure good drying afterwards. Flaming the kennel floor ensures elimination or at least reduction of infectious eggs and larvae. Most disinfectants are not effective against nematode eggs, nor are hand disinfectants, so gloves should be worn when handling feces.

== Dangers for humans ==
Humans are false hosts for the canine roundworm Toxocara canis and the canine hookworm (Ancylostoma caninum), i.e. the larvae damage infected organs but do not develop into adult worms. Both are the most important zoonotic agents among canine nematodes in Central Europe.

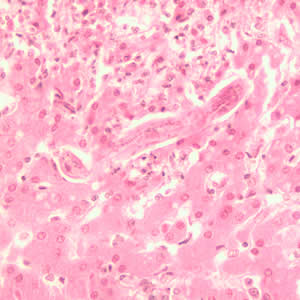
Toxocara larva in the liver of a human being

Infection with T. canis usually occurs via smear infection through peroral ingestion of soil contaminated with dog feces. Farmers, gardeners, canal workers, veterinarians and small children (playing in the sandbox) are particularly at risk. In Austria, antibodies to T. canis have been detected in 3.7% of healthy individuals (seroprevalence), and in 44% of individuals in exposed occupations. In Slovakia, seroprevalence has been found to be 12% in healthy blood donors from urban areas and 17% in those from rural areas. In the United States, 14% of the population is seropositive. An Egyptian study determined a seroprevalence of 18% in healthy adults, and a similarly high infection rate was found in children from rural regions in China. In Jordan, the seroprevalence is 11%, in Nigeria 30%, and in rural areas of Argentina 23%. However, these seroprevalence rates only indicate what percentage of the population has experienced an infection. However, such an infection does not necessarily have to result in disease, but can also be fought off by the immune system without symptoms of disease. In sandboxes of large European cities, contamination with worm eggs has been found in 10-100% of samples. Illnesses occur primarily in children and adolescents. The larvae of the canine roundworm can infect a wide variety of organs as visceral migrant larvae (larva migrans visceralis), where they cause severe tissue damage. The eyes, lungs, liver, and central nervous system are most commonly affected.

The larvae of A. caninum can penetrate the skin when walking barefoot over floors contaminated with dog feces. There, as migratory larvae (larva migrans cutanea, "skin mole"), they cause intensely itchy reddening of the skin. The ducts bored by the larvae are often visible to the naked eye. The disease usually heals spontaneously, although this can take months. Infections of this type are rare in Central Europe, however, but are one of the most common skin diseases in tropical and subtropical regions. In addition, A. caninum can also cause intestinal inflammation with signs of an acute abdomen.

Of the filariae, the heartworm (Dirofilaria immitis) and Dirofilaria repens are zoonotic agents. D. immitis rarely causes disease in humans, although about 20% of the population in endemic areas have antibodies. In most cases, larval encapsulation occurs in the lungs. More than 400 cases have been described for D. repens, in Europe mainly in Italy and France. Seroprevalence in humans is 68% in Italy and 22% in France. The adult worms migrate mainly to the subcutis, but can invade all kinds of organs.

The dog plays a role in the spread of trichinellosis in only a few regions of the world. In China, the consumption of dog meat is an important source of infection for humans. For infestation with the eye worm (thelaziosis), four human cases have been described so far in Italy and France, but the disease is particularly widespread among the poorer population in Asia. In addition, dogs may contribute to the spread of non-host-specific parasites such as the giant kidney worm or medina worm. However, the epidemiological significance of domestic dogs for human infections has not yet been investigated for these parasites.

To avoid zoonotic worm infections in humans, hygiene is one of the most important preventive measures. These include washing hands, disposing of dog and cat feces, and also refraining from eating unwashed vegetables.

== Bibliography ==
- Johannes Eckert et al. (Hrsg.): Lehrbuch der Parasitologie für die Tiermedizin. Enke-Verlag, 2. Auflage 2008, ISBN 978-3-8304-1072-0
- Thomas Schnieder (Hrsg.): Veterinärmedizinische Parasitologie. Paul Parey, 6. Auflage 2006, ISBN 3-8304-4135-5
- Peter F. Suter und Barbara Kohn (Hrsg.): Praktikum der Hundeklinik. Paul Parey, 10. Aufl. 2006, ISBN 978-3-8304-4141-0
