= Trichinella papuae =

Scientific classification
- Domain: Eukaryota
- Kingdom: Animalia
- Phylum: Nematoda
- Class: Enoplea
- Order: Trichocephalida
- Family: Trichinellidae
- Genus: Trichinella
- Species: T. papuae

Binomial name
- Trichinella papuae Pozio et al., 1999

Species of roundworm

Trichinella papuae is a nematode parasite responsible for a zoonotic disease called trichinellosis, predominantly in Thailand. Currently, eight species of Trichinella are known.

T. papuae is a nonencapsulated species, found in domestic and sylvatic swine of Papua New Guinea. This species differs by its larvae lacking a nurse cell in host muscle, and total length being one-third greater than T. pseudospiralis. Adults do not cross with adults from other species, and are unable to infect birds.

This species is known for surviving in carcasses of dead pigs.
