= Trichinella britovi =

Scientific classification
- Kingdom: Animalia
- Phylum: Nematoda
- Class: Enoplea
- Order: Trichocephalida
- Family: Trichinellidae
- Genus: Trichinella
- Species: T. britovi

Binomial name
- Trichinella britovi Pozio, la-Rosa, Murrell & Lichtenfels, 1992

Species of roundworm

Trichinella britovi is a nematode parasite responsible for a zoonotic disease called trichinellosis. Currently, eight species of Trichinella are known, only three of which cause trichinellosis, and Trichinella britovi is one of them. Numerous mammal species, as well as birds and crocodiles, can harbor the parasite worldwide, but the sylvatic cycle is mainly maintained by wild carnivores.

Humans represent only a possible host and the parasite is exclusively transmitted through consumption of raw or Rare Meat. In Europe, pork and wild boar meat are the main sources for human infection.

Because of mandatory veterinary controls in slaughterhouses, large trichinellosis outbreaks due to horse-meat consumption are rare, but cases in hunters and their families after raw or rare wild boar meat consumption are regularly reported, with over 100 cases since 1975.

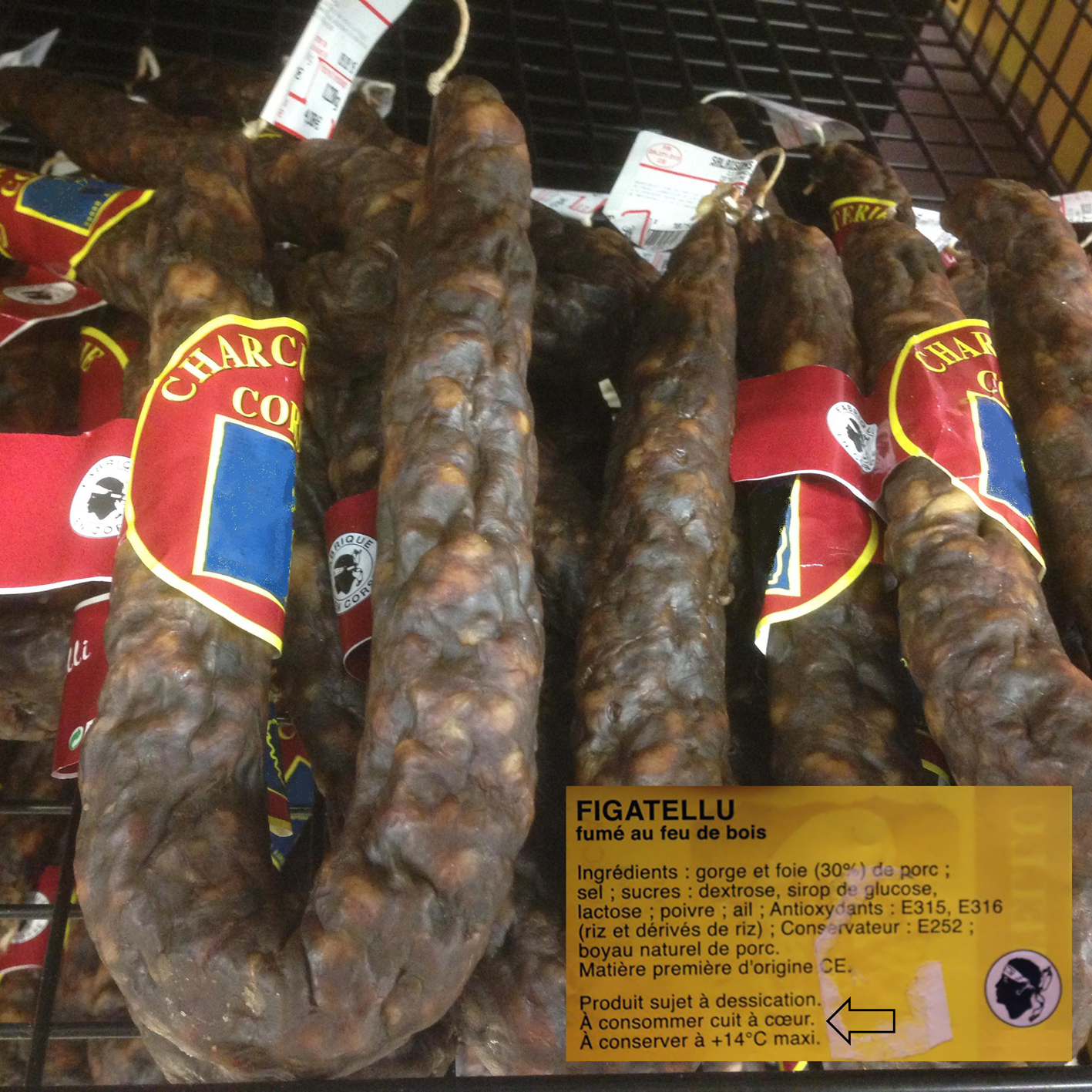
Pork sausages eaten raw by consumers caused an outbreak of trichinellosis in 2015 in France.

Trichinella britovi can be found in Europe and western Asia among carnivores such as wild boars, pigs, bears, etc.

T. britovi in wild boar is relatively resistant to freezing. In France, meat from naturally infected wild boar meat frozen for three weeks at −20 °C (−4 °F) remained infectious, whereas the parasites were not viable after four weeks.

In the 1960s, "trichinella infection" was documented in Senegal, West Africa. A survey of 160 wild animals from that region produced plausible evidence that European strains may have originated in Africa. It has also been proposed that strains of T. britovi are isolated to both African and European populations.

Three cases of human trichinellosis due to T. britovi were reported in 2015 in the Southeast of France resulting from consumption of raw pork sausages (figatelli) prepared in Corsica. Fourteen other people ate figatelli from the same batch, but were not infected due to the figatelli being well cooked.

Several outbreaks of human trichinellosis happened in the South of France or in the Piedmont region in Italy from 1993 to 2022, generally caused by the consumption of undercooked wild boar meat.

== Hosts and Life Cycle ==
There is not one preferred host or definitive host for Trichinella. The adults worms and the developing larvae inhabit the same infected vertebrate host that will serve as the definitive host and possibly even the intermediate host. The life cycle of all species in the genus Trichinella consist of two generations, reproductive adults and larvae that grow to the infective state, where the larvae will encyst in mammalian hosts. The hosts that affect infections in humans include the following: pigs, horses, wild boars, dogs, walruses, foxes, moose, and bears.

Its life cycle begins with the ingestion of an infected animal's meat, or muscle tissue where the larvae of the parasite were encysted. The larvae are released when digested in the stomach and penetrate the intestinal mucosa of the small intestine where in about 48 hours, the larvae will reach their adult stage. The male and female adults mate and after 5-7 days after infection, the female worms release new larvae into the lymphatic and blood vessels. The larvae use these vessels as transportation to the highly oxygenated muscle cells in the body.Within a few weeks, the host's immune response with kill all of the adult worms in the body and the larvae will begin to penetrate the muscle tissue/cells. The larvae will develop into the infective stage within the infected muscle cells that are now call nurse cells and encyst in the muscle tissue. After a certain period of time, this could be week, months, or even years, the cysts will undergo a calcification process if the larvae not ingested by another animal.

== Symptoms and Diagnosis ==
Light infections may show no signs of infection (asymptomatic). In cases where the adult worms have begun reproducing, there may be gastrointestinal symptoms such as diarrhea, abdominal pain, vomiting. When the larvae penetrate into the muscle cell and start encysting, it can cause periorbital and facial edema, conjunctivitis, fever, myalgias, splinter hemorrhages, rashes, and peripheral eosinophilia. There can be life-threatening effects like myocarditis, central nervous system involvement, and pneumonitis, however, they are uncommon.

To confirm a diagnosis of trichinellosis by T. britovi, the larvae must be found in the blood by serology or encysted larvae must be found in a biopsy or autopsy of the infected host.

== Prevention ==
To prevent trichinellosis, an official European directive recommends the freezing of meat at −25 °C (−13 °F) for at least 10 days for pieces of meat less than 25 cm (10 in) in thickness. Patients froze wild boar steaks at −35 °C (−31 °F) for seven days, but this freezing time appears insufficient to kill larvae, since T. britovi is a species relatively resistant to freezing.

Thus according to the International Commission on Trichinellosis, meat should be heated at 65 °C (149 °F) for at least 1 minute to kill Trichinella larvae; larvae die when the color of the meat at the core changes from pink to brown.

In the countries of the European Union, as well as Switzerland, a Trichinella test is required by law in Regulation (EC) No. 2075/2005. The reason for this is that Trichinella larvae can only be safely killed at core temperatures of at least 70 °C (158 °F) for one minute, but with larger pieces of meat, reaching the core temperature is associated with risks in practice. Heating in the microwave is not a reliable method. And smoking, curing and drying are not sufficiently effective measures for killing larvae. Killing the parasites by deep freezing is only a safe method for pork. Cold-resistant Trichinella species, such as Trichinella nativa, can occur in the meat of other animal species.
