= Trichinella nativa =

Scientific classification
- Kingdom: Animalia
- Phylum: Nematoda
- Class: Enoplea
- Order: Trichocephalida
- Family: Trichinellidae
- Genus: Trichinella
- Species: T. nativa

Binomial name
- Trichinella nativa Britov & Boev, 1972

Species of roundworm

Trichinella nativa is a nematode worm, one of the species of the genus Trichinella, found in arctic and subarctic regions.

== Biology ==
It is highly pathogenic and has a high resistance to freezing. It is encapsulated, and infects a wide variety of mammals and birds. Its lifecycle and pathogenesis are similar to Trichinella spiralis; T. nativa also can cause trichinosis. In Northern Europe T. nativa is a species commonly found in omnivores and carnivores such as wild boars, foxes, raccoon dogs and bears.

This nematode infects the muscles of mammals such as the Arctic fox and the polar bear. To complete its lifecycle, the flesh of its host must be eaten by some other mammal. In the Arctic, the corpses of animals that die may get frozen and later be consumed by scavengers. This worm remains viable even after being frozen at −18 °C (0 °F) for four years.
