= Anatrichosomatidae =

Scientific classification
- Domain: Eukaryota
- Kingdom: Animalia
- Phylum: Nematoda
- Class: Enoplea
- Order: Trichocephalida
- Family: Anatrichosomatidae

Family of roundworms

Anatrichosomatidae is a family of nematodes belonging to the order Trichocephalida.

Genera:

- Anatrichosoma Smith & Chitwood, 1954
