= Stichosome =

Component of nematode anatomy

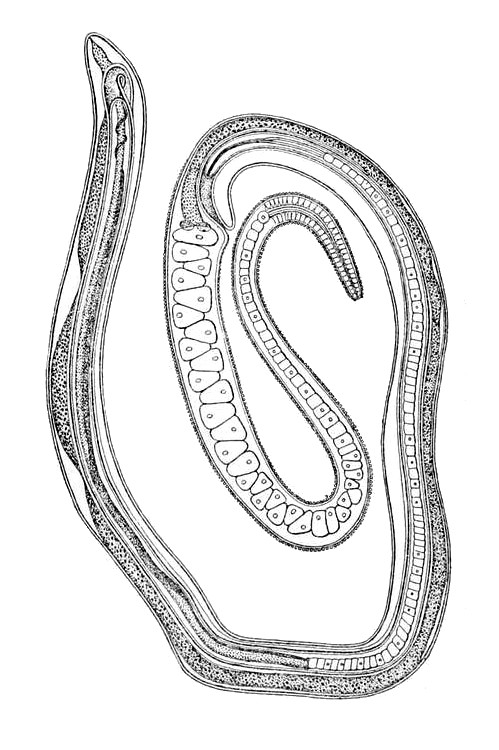
The stichosome is composed by very visible cells in Trichosomoides crassicauda

A stichosome (from Greek stichos (στίχος) = row; soma (σῶμα) = body) is a multicellular organ that is very prominent in some species of nematodes and consists of a longitudinal series of glandular cells (stichocytes) arranged in a row along the oesophagus that forms the posterior esophageal glands. Individual stichocytes contain networks of intracellular canaliculi and open into the esophageal lumen by a narrow duct process, likely with secretory functions. Function as a storage organ has also been proposed.

Notable taxa with stichosomes are families Mermithidae, Trichinellidae and Trichuridae within order Stichosomida and class Adenophorea, alternatively classified as the orders Trichinellida and Mermithida within subclass Dorylaimia and class Enoplea.
