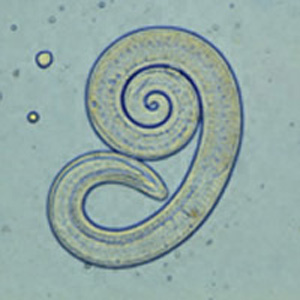

Scientific classification
- Kingdom: Animalia
- Phylum: Nematoda
- Class: Enoplea
- Order: Trichocephalida
- Family: Trichinellidae
- Genus: Trichinella
- Species: T. spiralis

Binomial name
- Trichinella spiralis (Owen, 1835)

= Trichinella spiralis =

Species of roundworm

Trichinella spiralis is a viviparous nematode parasite, occurring in rodents, pigs, bears, hyenas and humans, and is responsible for the disease trichinosis. It is sometimes referred to as the "pork worm" due to it being typically encountered in undercooked pork products. It should not be confused with the distantly related pork tapeworm.

== Description ==
Trichinella species, the smallest nematode parasite of humans, has an unusual life cycle, and are one of the most widespread and clinically important parasites in the world. The small adult worms mature in the small intestine of a definitive host, such as a pig. Each adult female produces batches of live larvae, which bore through the intestinal wall, enter the blood (to feed on it) and lymphatic system, and are carried to striated muscle. Once in the muscle, they encyst, or become enclosed in a capsule. Humans can become infected by eating infected pork, horsemeat, or wild carnivores such as fox, cat, hyena or bear.

=== Morphology ===
Males of T. spiralis measure between 1.4 and 1.6 mm long, and are more flat anteriorly than posteriorly. The anus can be found in the terminal end, and they have a large copulatory pseudobursa on each side. The females of T. spiralis are about twice the size of the males, and have an anus found terminally. The vulva is located near the esophagus. The single uterus of the female is filled with developing eggs in the posterior portion, while the anterior portion contains the fully developed juveniles.

== Life cycle ==
Trichinella spiralis can live the majority of its adult life in the intestines of humans. To begin its life cycle, T. spiralis adults invade the intestinal wall of a pig, and produce larvae that invade the pig's muscles. The larval forms are encapsulated as a small cystic structure within a muscle cell of the infected host. When another animal (perhaps a human) eats the infected meat, the larvae are released from the nurse cells in the meat (due to stomach pH), and migrate to the intestine, where they burrow into the intestinal mucosa, mature, and reproduce. Juveniles within nurse cells have an anaerobic or facultative anaerobic metabolism, but when they become activated, they adopt the aerobic metabolism characteristics of the adult.

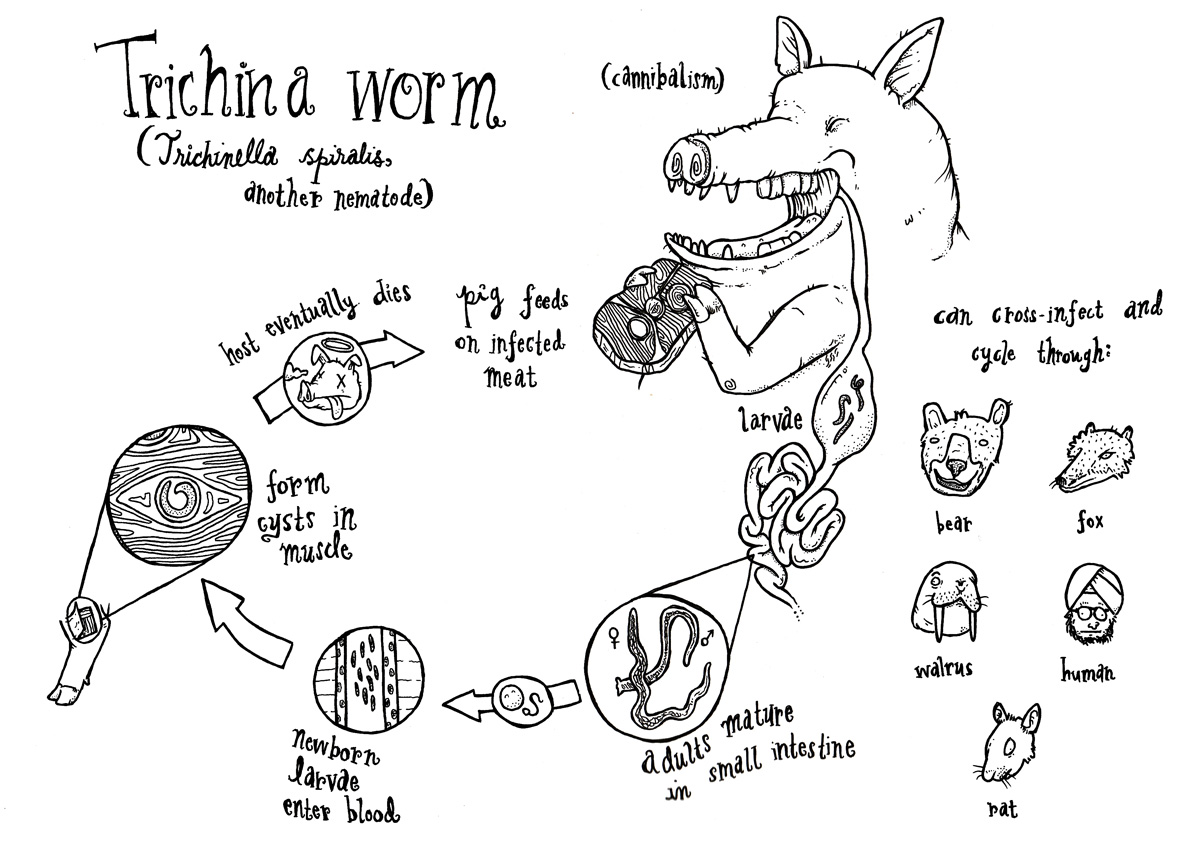
Trichinella spiralis life cycle

Female Trichinella worms live for about six weeks, and in that time can produce up to 1,500 larvae; when a spent female dies, she passes out of the host. The larvae gain access to the circulation and migrate around the body of the host, in search of a muscle cell in which to encyst. The migration and encystment of larvae can cause fever and pain, brought on by the host inflammatory response. In some cases, accidental migration to specific organ tissues can cause myocarditis and encephalitis that can result in death.

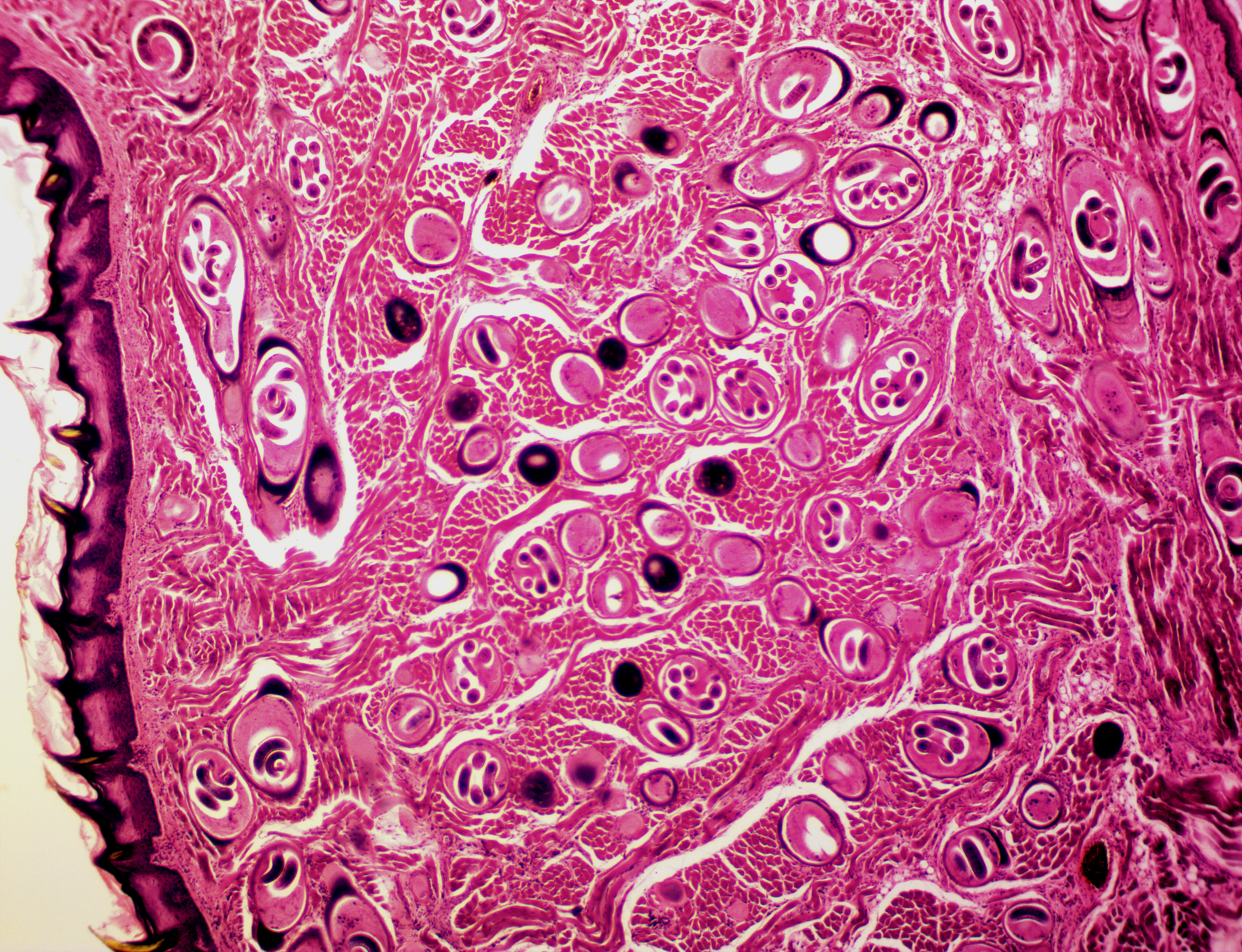
Animal tissue infected with the parasite that causes the disease trichinosis: Most parasites are shown in cross section, but some randomly appear in long section.

=== Nurse cell formation ===
This nematode is a multicellular parasite that lives within a single muscle cell, which it extensively modifies according to its own requirements.

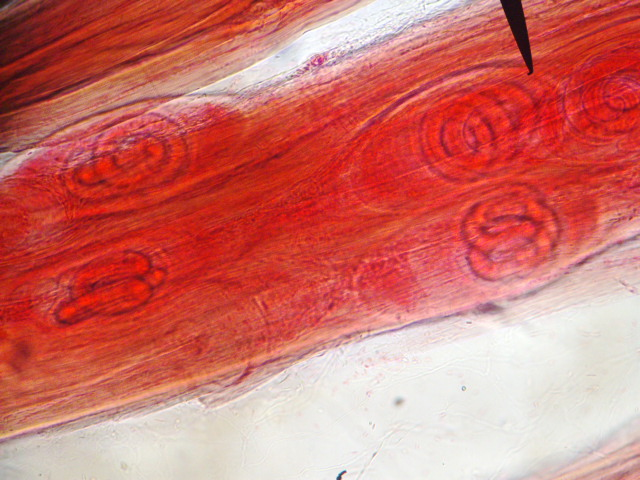
T. spiralis larvae within the diaphragm muscle of a pig

Nurse cell formation in skeletal muscle tissue is mediated by the hypoxic environment surrounding the new vessel formation. The hypoxic environment stimulates muscle cells in the surrounding tissue to upregulate and secrete angiogenic cytokines, such as vascular endothelial growth factor (VEGF). This allows the migrating T. spiralis larva to enter the myocyte and induce the transformation into the nurse cell. VEGF expression is detected surrounding the nurse cell immediately after nurse cell formation, and the continued secretion of VEGF can maintain the constant state of hypoxia.

== Symptoms ==
The first symptoms may appear between 12 hours and two days after ingestion of infected meat. The migration of adult worms in the intestinal epithelium can cause traumatic damage to the host tissue, and the waste products they excrete can provoke an immunological reaction. The resulting inflammation can cause symptoms such as nausea, vomiting, sweating, and diarrhea. Five to seven days after the appearance of these symptoms, facial edema and fever may occur. Ten days following ingestion, intense muscular pain, difficulty breathing, weakening of pulse and blood pressure, heart damage, and various nervous disorders may occur, eventually leading to death due to heart failure, respiratory complications, or kidney malfunction, all due to larval migration.

In pigs, infection is usually subclinical, but large worm burdens can be fatal in some cases.

== Diagnosis and treatment ==
Muscle biopsy may be used for trichinosis detection. Several immunodiagnostic tests are also available. Typically, patients are treated with either mebendazole or albendazole, but efficacy of such products is uncertain. Symptoms can be relieved by use of analgesics and corticosteroids.

In pigs, ELISA testing is possible as a method of diagnosis. Anthelmintics can treat and prevent Trichinella infections.

== Prevention and control ==
Trichinosis (trichinellosis) is a disease caused by tissue-dwelling roundworms of the species Trichinella spiralis. In the United States, the national trichinellosis surveillance system has documented a steady decline in the reported incidence of this disease. During 1947 to 1951, a median of 393 human cases was reported annually, including 57 trichinellosis-related deaths. During 1997–2001, the incidence in the US decreased to a median of 12 cases annually, with no reported deaths. The decrease was largely due to improved compliance with standards and regulations by commercial pork producers.

In the United States, Congress passed the Federal Swine Health Protection Act, restricting the use of uncooked garbage as feed stock for pigs, and creating a voluntary Trichinae Herd Certification Program. The Trichinae Herd Certification Program is a voluntary pre-slaughter pork safety program that provides documentation of swine management practices to minimize Trichinella exposure. The goal of the program is to establish a system under which pork production facilities that follow good production practices might be certified as Trichinella-safe. In addition to the reduction in Trichinella prevalence in commercial pork, processing methods also have contributed to the dramatic decline in human trichinellosis associated with pork products. Through the U.S. Code of Federal Regulations, the USDA has created guidelines for specific cooking temperatures and times, freezing temperatures and times, and curing methods for processed pork products to reduce the risk of human infection from Trichinella contaminated meat. Pork products meeting these guidelines are designated certified pork.

It was reported in 2005 that the prevalence of human infections from Trichinella spiralis was low in the United States, despite nonexistent meat inspection with respect to trichinella. This was due to strict enforcement of the regulations applying to large meat production facilities: most cases have been from raw or undercooked meat from game animals.

Also reported in 2005, the rate of infection from Trichinella spiralis was significantly higher in people living in parts of Europe, Asia, and Southeast Asia than in the United States. However, EU nations employ several strategies for detecting meat infected with Trichinella spiralis. If tests are consistently negative, then a trichinella-free designation is applied to a given meat supply. Rare outbreaks still occur despite this rigorous system: France, Italy, and Poland have reported outbreaks due to eating raw horsemeat. At that time, the parasite was considered endemic in Japan and China, while Korea had recently reported its first human cases of trichinosis.

In most abattoirs, the diaphragms of pigs are routinely sampled to detect Trichinella infections.

Post-slaughter human exposure is also preventable by educating consumers on simple steps that can be taken to kill any larvae that can potentially be in meat bought at the local supermarket. Freezing meat in an average household freezer for 20 days before consumption will kill some species of Trichinella. Cooking pork products to a minimum internal temperature of 160 °F (72 °C) for 3 minutes will kill most species, and is the best way to ensure the meat is safe to eat.

== Economic impact ==
It was reported in 2009 that political and economic changes had caused an increase in the prevalence and incidence rates of this parasite in many former eastern European countries due to weakened veterinary control on susceptible animals. This complicated the meat trade industry within European Union countries, and exportation of pork outside the EU. As a result, the European Union and some associated countries implemented a Trichinella monitoring program for pigs, horses, wild boar, and other wildlife species; while the European Commission implemented a new regulation to control Trichinella in meat in order to improve food safety for European consumers

Illegal pork importation from places with low safety standards allows the spread of the parasite from endemic to nonendemic countries. Illegal importation and new food practices and dishes including raw meat have resulted in human trichinosis outbreaks in many European countries, including Denmark, Germany, Italy, Spain, and the United Kingdom.

The economic cost of detecting trichinosis can be another cost burden. In 1998, a rough global cost estimate was $3.00 per pig to detect the parasite. At the same time, in the 15 countries comprising the European Union in 1998, about 190 million pigs were killed in slaughterhouses annually, leading to an estimated economic impact of testing of about $570 million per year. However, depending on the size of the specific slaughterhouse, the actual costs could be more than an order of magnitude smaller (i.e. less than $0.30 per pig).

== Genome ==
The Trichinella spiralis draft genome became available in March, 2011. The genome size was 58.55 Mbp with an estimated 16,549 genes. The T. spiralis genome is the only known nematode genome to be subject to DNA methylation, an epigenetic mechanism that was not previously thought to exist in nematodes.

== See also ==
- List of parasites (human)
