= International Commission on Trichinellosis =

Organization

The International Commission on Trichinellosis is an international organization founded in 1958 in Budapest. It aims to exchange information on the biology, physiopathology, epidemiology, immunology, and clinical aspects of trichinellosis in humans and animals.

== International Conferences on Trichinellosis ==
The International Commission on Trichinellosis is the initiator and participant in organization of the International Conferences on Trichinellosis. Since its creation, members (more than 110 from 46 countries) have regularly gathered and worked together during meetings held every 4 years: the International Conferences on Trichinellosis.

Year	Location
1960	Warsaw, Poland
1964	Wrocław, Poland
1972	Miami, United States
1976	Poznań, Poland
1980	Noordwijk aan Zee, The Netherlands
1984	Val-Morin, Canada
1988	Alicante. Spain
1993	Orvieto, Italy
1996	Mexico City, Mexico
2000	Fontainebleau, France
2004	San Diego, United States
2007	Plitvice Lakes National Park, Croatia
2011	Changchun, China
2015	Berlin, Germany
2019	Cluj-Napoca, Romania
