= Cystoopsidae =

Scientific classification
- Domain: Eukaryota
- Kingdom: Animalia
- Phylum: Nematoda
- Class: Enoplea
- Order: Trichocephalida
- Family: Cystoopsidae

Family of roundworms

Cystoopsidae is a family of nematodes belonging to the order Trichocephalida.

Genera:

- Cystoopsis Wagner, 1867
- Dioctowittus Chabaud & Hoa, 1960
