= Artificial digestion =

Lab technique to break down food

Artificial digestion is a laboratory technique that reduces food to protein, fat, carbohydrates, fiber, minerals, vitamins, and non-nutrient compounds for analytical or research purposes. Digestive agents such as pepsin and hydrochloric acid are typically used to accomplish artificial digestion.

== Meat inspection ==
Artificial digestion is used to detect the presence of encysted trichinella larvae in suspected muscle tissue. Prior to this method, a sample of muscle tissue was compressed to visually express the encysted parasite. Using artificial digestion, meat samples are dissolved by a digestive solution and the remains are examined for the presence of larvae.

== Digestion research ==
Artificial stomach and small intestine models are used instead of laboratory animals or human test subjects. Various models, from static one-compartment to dynamic multicompartment, exist. These models are used to study food digestion and subsequent bioavailability.

== See also ==
- Digestion
