= Stichocyte =

Glandular cells associated with the esophagus in nematodes

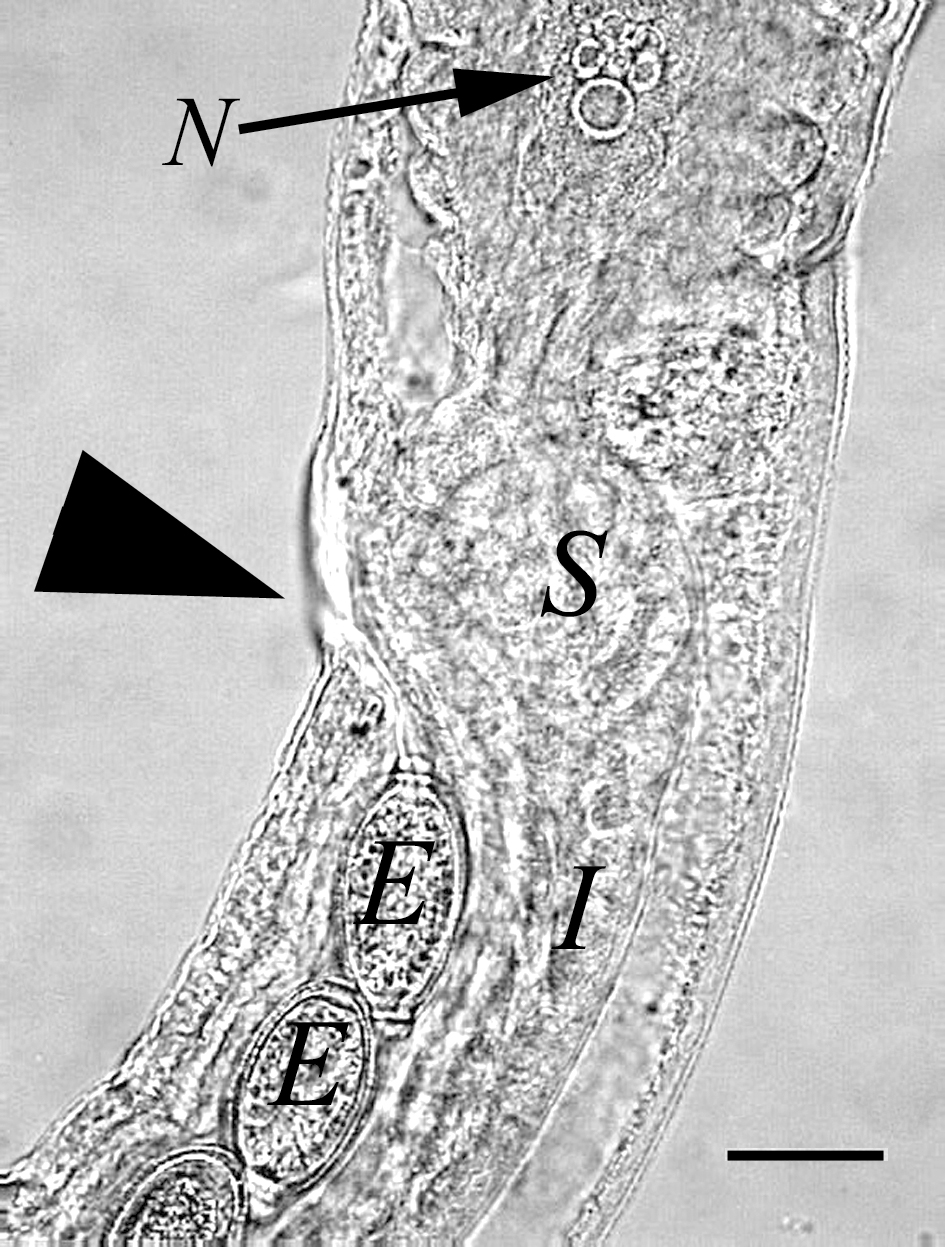
Stichocyte at the posterior extremity of the oesophagus in Capillaria aerophila. N: nucleus of the posteriormost stichocyte. Bar = 50 μm

Stichocytes are glandular unicellular cells arranged in a row along the posterior portion of the oesophagus, each of which communicates by a single pore with the lumen of the oesophagus. They contain mitochondria, rough endoplasmic reticulum, abundant Golgi apparatuses, and usually 1 of 2 types of secretory granules, α-granules and β-granules, indicating secretory function. Collectively stichocytes form the stichosome. Characteristic of Trichocephalida and Mermithida, two groups of nematodes.
