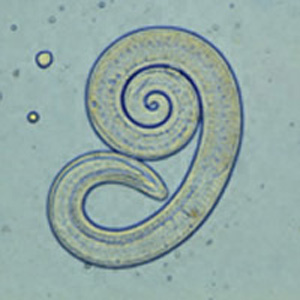
- Larva of Trichinella sp.

Scientific classification
- Kingdom: Animalia
- Phylum: Nematoda
- Class: Enoplea
- Order: Trichocephalida
- Family: Trichinellidae
- Genus: Trichinella; Railliet, 1895

Species
- Trichinella britovi Trichinella murrelli Trichinella nativa Trichinella nelsoni Trichinella papuae Trichinella pseudospiralis Trichinella spiralis Trichinella zimbabwensis

= Trichinella =

Genus of worms

Trichinella is the genus of parasitic roundworms of the phylum Nematoda that cause trichinosis (also known as trichinellosis). Members of this genus are often called trichinella or trichina worms. A characteristic of Nematoda is the one-way digestive tract, with a pseudocoelom (body cavity made up of only an ectoderm and endoderm).

The genus was first recognised in a larval form in 1835. The L1 larvae live in a modified skeletal muscle cell. The adult worms occupy a membrane-bound portion of columnar epithelium, living as intramulticellular parasites of animals, including humans. Infections with this genus have been reported from more than 150 different naturally or experimentally infected hosts. It has been shown to have a worldwide distribution in domestic and/or sylvatic animals.

Trichinella is the smallest human nematode parasite, yet it is also the largest of all intracellular parasites.

Oral ingestion of cyst- or larvae-contaminated tissue is the usual route of infection, but congenital and mammary transmission can occur in rats.

== Phylogenetics ==
Eight species are currently recognized. Four additional genotypes require adequate description before they can be recognized as valid species.

Two main clades are recognized in the genus: one group (T. britovi, T. murrelli, T. nativa, T. nelsoni, T. spiralis) that encapsulates in host muscle tissue and a second (T. papuae, T. pseudospiralis, T. zimbabwensis) that does not.

The nonencapsulated group infects saurians, crocodilians, and other nonavian archosaurs (T. papuae, T. zimbabwensis) and birds (T. pseudospiralis). The encapsulated group infects synapsid and mammalian hosts. T. spiralis and T. nelsoni appear to be basal in the encapsulated group and T. murrelli and T. nativa the most recently evolved.

== Prevalence in animals and humans ==
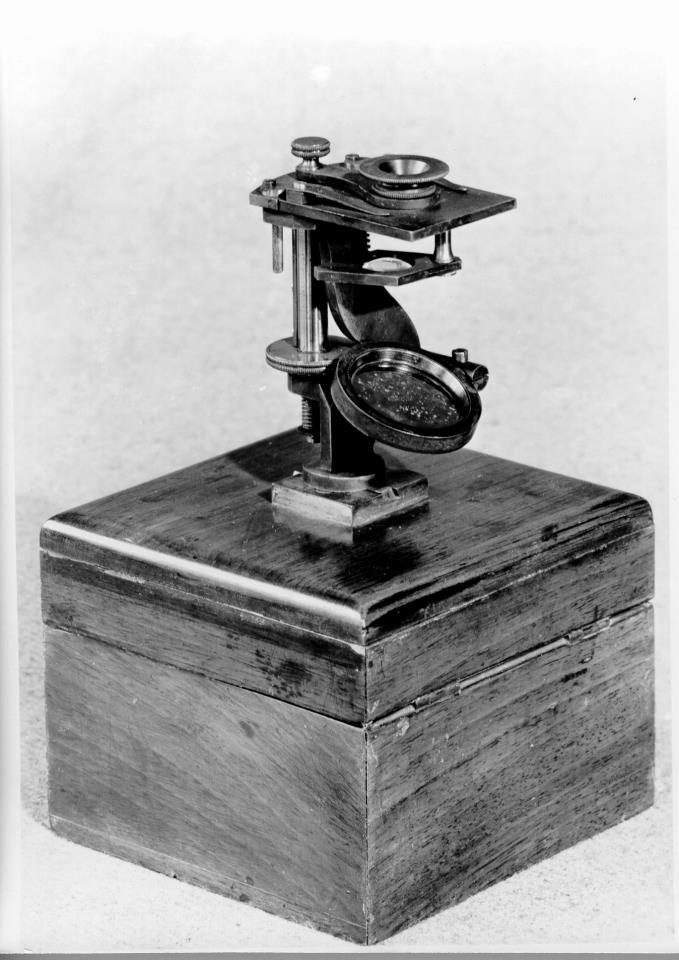
A microscope for Trichinella detection (from 1847).

Trichinella species can infect swine, wild omnivores (foxes, wolves, bears, skunk, raccoons, rats, and other small mammals), and humans.

In swine, the prevalence varies from country to country, and regionally. Long-standing meat inspection programs in some European countries have drastically lowered prevalence rates among domestic swine. Domestic swine can be exposed to the parasite by:

- Feeding of animal waste products or other feed contaminated with Trichinella
- Exposure to infected rodents or other infected wildlife
- Cannibalism within an infected herd

In wild animals, Trichinella infection rates vary from region to region and seem to increase in colder climates. Foxes, wolves, and bears have the highest infection rates, but small mammals, such as skunks, raccoons, and rats, provide the highest risk to infecting the domestic pig. In horses, natural infections are rare; however, horses from Mexico and Romania have been found to be infected. Other herbivores, such as moose may also be a potential host and source of Trichinella, however data is inconclusive.

Human infection caused by the domestic pig varies from country to country. While some countries do not report any human infection, other countries in Eastern Europe and Asia report hundreds or thousands of cases annually.

The United States reported 25 cases per year from 1991 to 1996, with few implicating raw or undercooked pork. Documented sources of human infection have also included game meats, such as wild boar, bear, walrus, fox, and cougar. From 1997 to 2001 meats other than pork were the most common source of infection, with more cases associated with home-raised pork than commercial. The decreased incidence of trichinellosis in the United States has resulted from changes in pork industry management standards and government regulations.

In Finland, meat inspection revealed a small but worrisome number of swine infections in the early 1980s, peaking in 1996. However, due to the swine industry's modernization process, the number of cases decreased, with the last infected swine diagnosed in 2004. By 2010, only eight known human infections had been reported in Finland since the 1800s, with the last one more than three decades before.

A study of the sera from 197 wild boars from 25 farms slaughtered in Finland between 2007 and 2008 found four (2.0%) of the sera, originating from three (12.0%) farms, to be Trichinella-seropositive.

Trichinosis is often diagnosed in humans once the larvae invade the muscle tissue. Some symptoms include fever, myalgia, malaise, and edema. Trichinosis treatment focuses on reducing inflammation, and corticosteroids are usually administered. This treatment often leads to complete recovery, but muscle pain and weakness may persist.

Knowledge on the epidemiology, host range and transmission of Trichinella species occurring in wildlife in sub-Saharan Africa is limited. However, hypothetical transmission cycles have been proposed for Trichinella zimbabwensis, Trichinella T8 and Trichinella nelsoni; these cycles consider the role of lions and spotted hyenas as apex predators.

=== Detection ===
Artificial digestion is used to detect the presence of encysted trichinella larvae in suspected muscle tissue. The meat sample is dissolved by a digestive solution and the remains are examined for the presence of larvae.

=== Treatment ===
Treatment is by either thiabendazole or mebendazole.

=== Prevention ===
Trichinella infection can be prevented by cooking pork meat properly, or by freezing pork. However, freezing pork is not an effective method for killing larvae.

One way to prevent trichinellosis is to cook meat to a safe temperature (at least 145 °F, 63 °C internal temperature as measured by a food thermometer, followed by a three-minute rest for fresh pork). The meat is not safe until cooking is completed. To help prevent Trichinella infection in animal populations, pigs or wild animals should be prevented from eating uncooked meat, scraps, or carcasses of any animals, including rats, which may be infected with Trichinella, in order to break the oral ingestion cycle of infection.

In the countries of the European Union, as well as Switzerland, a Trichinella test is required by law in Regulation (EC) No. 2075/2005. The reason for this is that Trichinella larvae can only be safely killed at core temperatures of at least 70 °C (158 °F) for one minute, but with larger pieces of meat, reaching the core temperature is associated with risks in practice. Heating in the microwave is not a reliable method. And smoking, curing and drying are not sufficiently effective measures for killing larvae. Killing the parasites by deep freezing is only a safe method for pork. Cold-resistant Trichinella species, such as Trichinella nativa, can occur in the meat of other animal species.
