= Anatrichosoma =

Scientific classification
- Domain: Eukaryota
- Kingdom: Animalia
- Phylum: Nematoda
- Class: Enoplea
- Order: Trichocephalida
- Family: Trichuridae
- Genus: Anatrichosoma; Smith & Chitwood, 1954

Genus of roundworms

Anatrichosoma is a genus of nematodes belonging to the family Trichuridae.

Species:

- Anatrichosoma buccalis Pence & Little, 1972
- Anatrichosoma cutaneum Swift, Boots & Miles, 1922
- Anatrichosoma cynomolgi Smith & Chitwood, 1954
- Anatrichosoma gerbillis (Bernard, 1969)
- Anatrichosoma haycocki Spratt, 1982
