= Nurse cell =

General term for cells providing nutrition

In general biology or reproductive physiology, a nurse cell is a cell which provides food, helps other cells and provides stability to neighboring cells. The term nurse cell is used in several unrelated ways in different scientific fields.

== Human physiology ==
Nurse cells are specialized macrophages residing in the bone marrow that assist in the development of red blood cells. They absorb the nuclei of immature red blood cells and may provide growth factors to help the red blood cells mature. In the bone marrow, immature red blood cells (erythroblasts) can be seen grouped in a cluster around a nurse cell.

The epithelial cell found in the cortex of the thymus is also called a "nurse cell." These cells produce Thymic hormones that cause T lymphocytes to mature and differentiate.

== Parasitology ==
In parasitology, a nurse cell is an infected cell in the disease trichinosis discovered by Dickson Despommier. A trichinella larva enters a cell and develops there, probably as a way of concealing itself from the immune system. The parasite has evolved a way of stimulating blood vessel development around the cell, in order to receive the nutrients it needs. In trichinosis, nurse cells are invariably skeletal muscle cells; these are the only type of cell that can support the parasite.

== Mycology ==
In mycology, a nurse cell is any hyphae that supplies food material to spores that have detached from the basidia; used especially in reference to taxa from the family Sclerodermataceae.

== Cell biology ==
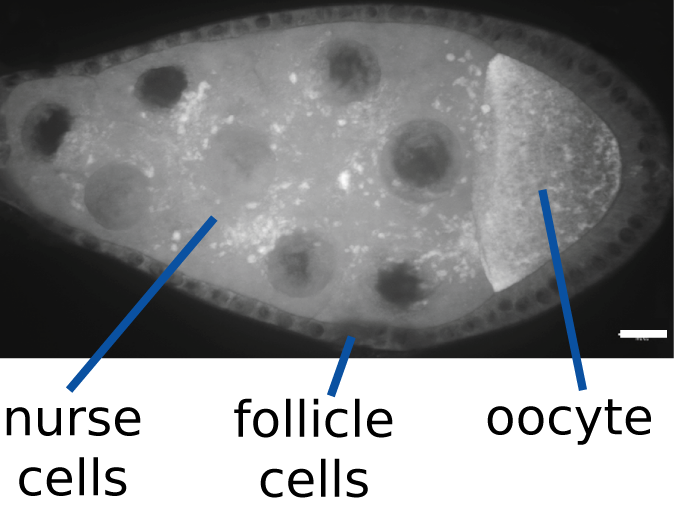
Ribonucleoprotein particles (GFP-Imp) in the Drosophila melanogaster egg chamber, being transported from the nurse cells to the oocyte

In respect to invertebrates, nurse cells are polytenic germline cells that contribute to the development of the oocyte, producing multiple nuclei. In fruit flies (Drosophila), nurse cells surround the developing oocyte and synthesize proteins and RNAs that are to be deposited in it. Nurse cells are highly polyploid (up to 8000C). They dump their cytoplasm, containing RNAs and proteins, into the oocyte via ring canals.

Due to their high metabolic activity, nurse cells likely experience the DNA damaging effect of oxidative free radicals produced as a byproduct of this metabolism. This damaging effect would otherwise befall the DNA of the egg cells if they were responsible for their own synthesis. The many genome copies in each nurse cell may provide redundancy of genetic information that would allow the nurse cell to carry out its provisioning function even in the face of considerable oxidative DNA damage.

== See also ==
- Angiogenesis
- Sertoli cell
- Thymic nurse cell
