= Trichinosis =

Parasitic disease caused by roundworms

- Other names: Trichinellosis, trichiniasis
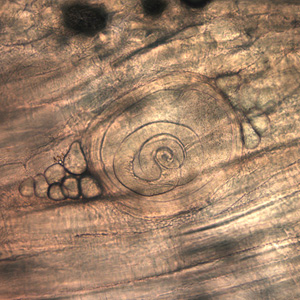
- Trichinella larvae in pressed bear meat, partially digested with pepsin. The classic coil shape is visible.
- Specialty: Infectious disease
- Symptoms: Initially: diarrhea, abdominal pain, vomiting Later: swelling of the face, inflammation of the whites of the eyes, fever, muscle pains, rash
- Complications: Inflammation of heart muscle, inflammation of the lungs
- Causes: Trichinella from eating undercooked meat
- Diagnostic method: Antibodies in the blood, larvae on tissue biopsy
- Differential diagnosis: Measles, dermatomyositis, gastroenteritis
- Prevention: Fully cooking meat
- Medication: Albendazole, mebendazole
- Prognosis: Low risk of death
- Frequency: ~10,000 cases a year

Trichinosis, also known as trichinellosis, is a parasitic disease caused by roundworms of the Trichinella genus. During the initial infection, invasion of the intestines can result in diarrhea, abdominal pain, and vomiting. Migration of larvae to muscle, which occurs about a week after being infected, can cause swelling of the face, inflammation of the whites of the eyes, fever, muscle pains, and a rash. Minor infection may be without symptoms. Complications may include inflammation of heart muscle, central nervous system involvement, and inflammation of the lungs.

Trichinosis is mainly spread when undercooked meat containing Trichinella cysts is eaten. Wild meat is more likely to contain the parasite. In North America this is most often bear, but infection can also occur from pork, boar, and dog meat. Several species of Trichinella can cause disease, with T. spiralis being the most common. After the infected meat has been eaten, the larvae are released from their cysts in the stomach. They then invade the wall of the small intestine, where they develop into adult worms. After one week, the females release new larvae that migrate to voluntarily controlled muscles, where they form cysts. The diagnosis is usually based on symptoms and confirmed by finding specific antibodies in the blood, or larvae on tissue biopsy.

The best way to prevent trichinosis is to fully cook meat. A food thermometer can verify that the temperature inside the meat is high enough. Infection is typically treated with antiparasitic medication such as albendazole or mebendazole. Rapid treatment may kill adult worms and thereby stop further worsening of symptoms. Both medications are considered safe but have been associated with side effects such as bone marrow suppression. Their use during pregnancy or in children under the age of 2 years is poorly studied but appears to be safe. Treatment with steroids is sometimes also required in severe cases. Without treatment, symptoms typically resolve within three months.

Worldwide, about 10,000 trichinosis infections occur a year. At least 55 countries including the United States, China, Argentina, and Russia have had recently documented cases. While trichinosis does occur in the tropics, it is actually less common there. Rates of trichinosis in the United States have decreased from about 400 cases per year in the 1940s to 20 or fewer per year in the 2000s. The risk of death from infection is low.

== Signs and symptoms ==
The great majority of trichinosis infections have either minor or no symptoms and no complications. The two main phases for the infection are enteral (affecting the intestines) and parenteral (outside the intestines). The symptoms vary depending on the phase, species of Trichinella, the quantity of encysted larvae ingested, age, sex, and host immunity.

=== Enteral phase ===
A large burden of adult worms in the intestines promotes symptoms such as nausea, heartburn, dyspepsia, and diarrhea from two to seven days after infection, while small worm burdens generally are asymptomatic. Eosinophilia presents early and increases rapidly.

=== Parenteral phase ===
The severity of symptoms caused by larval migration from the intestines depends on the number of larvae produced. As the larvae migrate through tissue and vessels, the body's inflammatory response results in edema, muscle pain, fever, and weakness. A classic sign of trichinosis is periorbital edema, swelling around the eyes, which may be caused by vasculitis. Splinter hemorrhage in the nails is also a common symptom.

They may very rarely cause enough damage to produce serious neurological deficits (such as ataxia or respiratory paralysis) from worms entering the central nervous system (CNS), which is compromised by trichinosis in 10–24% of reported cases of cerebral venous sinus thrombosis, a very rare form of stroke (three or four cases per million annual incidence in adults). Trichinosis can be fatal depending on the severity of the infection; death can occur 4–6 weeks after the infection, and is usually caused by myocarditis, encephalitis, or pneumonia.

== Cause ==
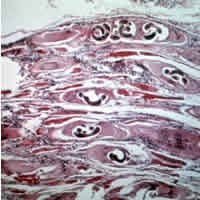
Trichinella spiralis larvae in muscle tissue

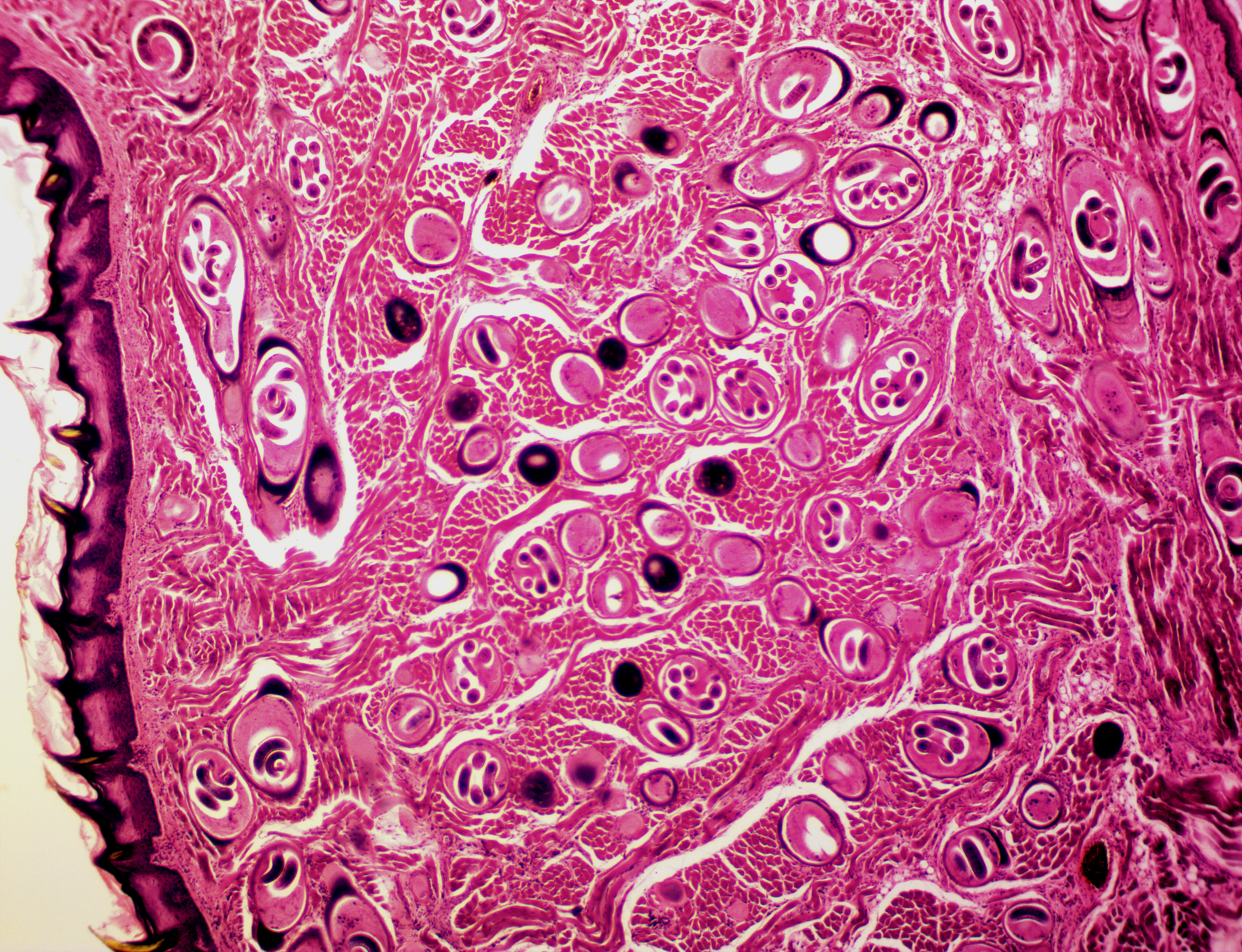
Animal tissue infected with the parasite that causes the disease trichinosis: Most parasites are shown in cross-section, but some randomly appear in long section.

The classical agent is T. spiralis (found worldwide in many carnivorous and omnivorous animals, both domestic and sylvatic (wild), but seven primarily sylvatic species of Trichinella also are now recognized:

=== Species and characteristics ===
- T. spiralis is most adapted to swine, most pathogenic in humans, and is cosmopolitan in distribution.
- T. britovi is the second-most common species to infect humans; it is distributed throughout Europe, Asia, and northern and western Africa, usually in wild carnivores, crocodiles, birds, wild boar, and domesticated pigs.
- T. murrelli also infects humans, especially from black bear meat; it is distributed among wild carnivores in North America.
- T. nativa, which has a high resistance to freezing, is found in the Arctic and subarctic regions; reservoir hosts include polar bears, Arctic foxes, walruses, and other wild game.
- T. nelsoni, found in East African predators and scavengers, has been documented to cause a few human cases.
- T. papuae infects both mammals and reptiles, including crocodiles, humans, and wild and domestic pigs; this species, found in Papua New Guinea and Thailand, is also nonencapsulated.
- T. pseudospiralis infects birds and mammals, and has demonstrated infection in humans; it is a nonencapsulated species.
- T. zimbabwensis can infect mammals, and possibly humans; this nonencapsulated species was detected in crocodiles in Africa.

=== Taxonomy ===
- Kingdom: Animalia
- Phylum: Nematoda
- Class: Adenophorea
- Order: Trichurida
- Family: Trichinellidae
- Genus: Trichinella

=== Lifecycle ===
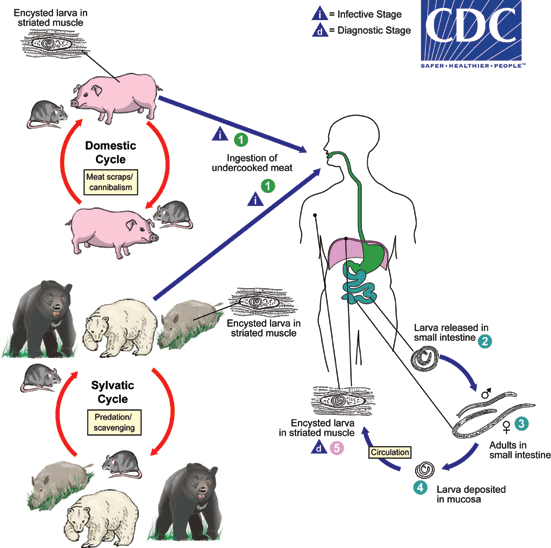
Lifecycle of Trichinella spiralis

The typical lifecycle for T. spiralis involves humans, pigs, and rodents. A pig becomes infected when it eats infectious cysts in raw meat, often porcine carrion or a rat (sylvatic cycle). A human becomes infected by consuming raw or undercooked infected pork (domestic cycle). In the stomach, the cysts from infected undercooked meat are acted on by pepsin and hydrochloric acid, which help release the larvae from the cysts into the stomach. The larvae then migrate to the small intestine, and burrow into the intestinal mucosa, where they molt four times before becoming adults.

30 to 34 hours after the cysts were originally ingested, the adults mate, and within five days produce larvae. Adult worms can only reproduce for a limited time because the immune system eventually expels them from the small intestine. The larvae then use their piercing mouthpart, called the "stylet", to pass through the intestinal mucosa and enter the lymphatic vessels, and then enter the bloodstream.

The larvae travel by capillaries to various organs, such as the retina, myocardium, or lymph nodes; however, only larvae that migrate to skeletal muscle cells survive and encyst. The larval host cell becomes a nurse cell, in which the larva will be encapsulated, potentially for the life of the host, waiting for the host to be eaten. The development of a capillary network around the nurse cell completes encystation of the larva. Trichinosis is not soil-transmitted, as the parasite does not lay eggs, nor can it survive long outside a host.

== Diagnosis ==
Diagnosis of trichinosis is confirmed by a combination of exposure history, clinical diagnosis, and laboratory testing.

=== Exposure history ===
An epidemiological investigation can be done to determine a patient's exposure to raw infected meat. Often, an infection arises from home preparation of contaminated meat, in which case microscopy of the meat may be used to determine the infection. Exposure determination does not have to be directly from a laboratory-confirmed infected animal. Indirect exposure criteria include the consumption of products from a laboratory-confirmed infected animal or sharing of a common exposure with a laboratory-confirmed infected human.

=== Clinical diagnosis ===
Clinical presentation of the common trichinosis symptoms may also suggest infection. These symptoms include eye puffiness, splinter hemorrhage, nonspecific gastroenteritis, and muscle pain. The case definition for trichinosis at the European Center for Disease Control states, "at least three of the following six: fever, muscle soreness and pain, gastrointestinal symptoms, facial edema, eosinophilia, and subconjunctival, subungual, and retinal hemorrhages."

=== Laboratory testing ===
Blood tests and microscopy can be used to aid in the diagnosis of trichinosis. Blood tests include a complete blood count for eosinophilia, creatine phosphokinase activity, and various immunoassays such as ELISA for larval antigens.

In some cases, muscle biopsies are performed, where "0.2 to 0.5 grams of human or animal skeletal muscle tissue is collected and examined for Trichinella larvae via artificial digestion or histological analysis."

== Prevention ==
=== Legislation ===
Laws and rules for food producers may improve food safety for consumers, such as the rules established by the European Commission for inspections, rodent control, and improved hygiene. A similar protocol exists in the United States, in the USDA guidelines for farms and slaughterhouse responsibilities in inspecting pork.

=== Education and training ===
Public education about the dangers of consuming raw and undercooked meat, especially pork, may reduce infection rates. Hunters are also an at-risk population due to their contact and consumption of wild game, including bears. As such, many states, such as New York, require the completion of a course in such matters before a hunting license can be obtained.

=== Meat testing ===
Testing methods are available for both individual carcasses and monitoring of the herds. Artificial digestion method is usually used for the testing of individual carcasses, while the testing for specific antibodies is usually used for herd monitoring.

=== Food preparation ===
Larvae may be killed by the heating or irradiation of raw meat. Freezing is normally only effective for T. spiralis, since other species, such as T. nativa, are freeze-resistant and can survive long-term freezing.

- All meat (including pork) can be safely prepared by cooking to an internal temperature of 165 °F (74 °C) or higher for 15 seconds or more.
- Wild game: Wild game meat must be cooked thoroughly (see meat preparation above). Freezing wild game does not kill all trichinosis larval worms, because the worm species that typically infests wild game can resist freezing.
- Pork: Freezing cuts of pork less than 6 inches thick for 20 days at 5 °F (−15 °C) or three days at −4 °F (−20 °C) kills T. spiralis larval worms; but this will not kill other trichinosis larval worm species, such as T. nativa, if they have infested the pork food supply (which is unlikely, due to geography).

Pork can be safely cooked to a slightly lower temperature, provided that the internal meat temperature is at least as hot for at least as long as listed in the USDA table below. Nonetheless, allowing a margin of error for variation in internal temperature within a particular cut of pork, which may have bones that affect temperature uniformity, is prudent. In addition, kitchen thermometers have measurement errors that must be considered. Pork may be cooked for significantly longer and at a higher uniform internal temperature than listed below to be safe.

Internal Temperature	Internal Temperature	Minimum Time
(°F)	(°C)	(minutes)
120	49	1260
122	50.0	570
124	51.1	270
126	52.2	120
128	53.4	60
130	54.5	30
132	55.6	15
134	56.7	6
136	57.8	3
138	58.9	2
140	60.0	1
142	61.1	1
144	62.2	Instant

Unsafe and unreliable methods of cooking meat include the use of microwave ovens, curing, drying, and smoking, as these methods are difficult to standardize and control.

=== Pig farming ===
Incidence of infection can be reduced by:

- Keeping pigs in clean pens, with floors that can be washed (such as concrete)
- Not allowing hogs to eat carcasses of other animals, including rats, which may be infected with Trichinella
- Cleaning meat grinders thoroughly when preparing ground meats
- Control and destruction of meat containing trichinae, e.g., removal and proper disposal of porcine diaphragms before public sale of meat

The US Centers for Disease Control and Prevention makes the following recommendation: "Curing (salting), drying, smoking, or microwaving meat does not consistently kill infective worms." However, under controlled commercial food processing conditions, some of these methods are considered effective by the USDA.

The USDA Animal and Plant Health Inspection Service (APHIS) is responsible for the regulations concerning the importation of swine from foreign countries. The Foreign Origin Meat and Meat Products, Swine section covers swine meat (cooked, cured, dried, and fresh). APHIS developed the National Trichinae Certification Program; this is a voluntary "preharvest" program for U.S. swine producers "that will provide documentation of swine management practices" to reduce the incidence of Trichinella in swine. The CDC reports 0.013% of U.S. swine are infected with Trichinella.

== Treatment ==
As with most diseases, early treatment is better and decreases the risk of developing the disease. If larvae do encyst in skeletal muscle cells, they can remain infectious for months to years.

=== Primary treatment ===
Early administration of anthelmintics, such as mebendazole or albendazole, decreases the likelihood of larval encystation, particularly if given within three days of infection. However, most cases are diagnosed after this time. In humans, mebendazole (200–400 mg three times a day for three days) or albendazole (400 mg twice a day for 8–14 days) is given to treat trichinosis. These drugs prevent newly hatched larvae from developing, but should not be given to pregnant women or children under two years of age.

Medical references from the 1940s described no specific treatment for trichinosis at the time, but intravenous injection of calcium salts was found to be useful in managing symptoms related to severe toxemia from the infection.

=== Secondary treatment ===
After infection, steroids, such as prednisone, may be used to relieve muscle pain associated with larval migration.

=== Vaccine research ===
Researchers trying to develop a vaccine for Trichinella have tried using either "larval extracts, excretory-secretory antigen, DNA, or recombinant antigen protein." Currently, no marketable vaccine is available for trichinosis, but experimental mouse studies have suggested possibilities.

- In one study, microwaved Trichinella larvae were used to immunize mice (orally or intraperitoneally), which were subsequently infected. Depending on the dosage and frequency of immunization, results ranged from a decreased larval count to complete protection from trichinosis.
- Another study used extracts and excretory-secretory products from first-stage larvae to produce an oral vaccine. To prevent gastric acids from dissolving the antigens before reaching the small intestine, scientists encapsulated the antigens in microcapsules. This vaccine significantly increased CD4+ cell levels, and increased antigen-specific serum IgGq and IgA, resulting in a statistically significant reduction in the average number of adult worms in the small intestines of mice. The significance of this approach is that, if the white blood cells in the small intestine have been exposed to Trichinella antigens (through vaccination) when an individual does get infected, the immune system will respond to expel the worms from the small intestine fast enough to prevent the female worms from releasing their larvae.
- A DNA vaccine tested on mice "induced a muscle larva burden reduction in BALB/c mice by 29% in response to T. spiralis infection".

== Epidemiology ==
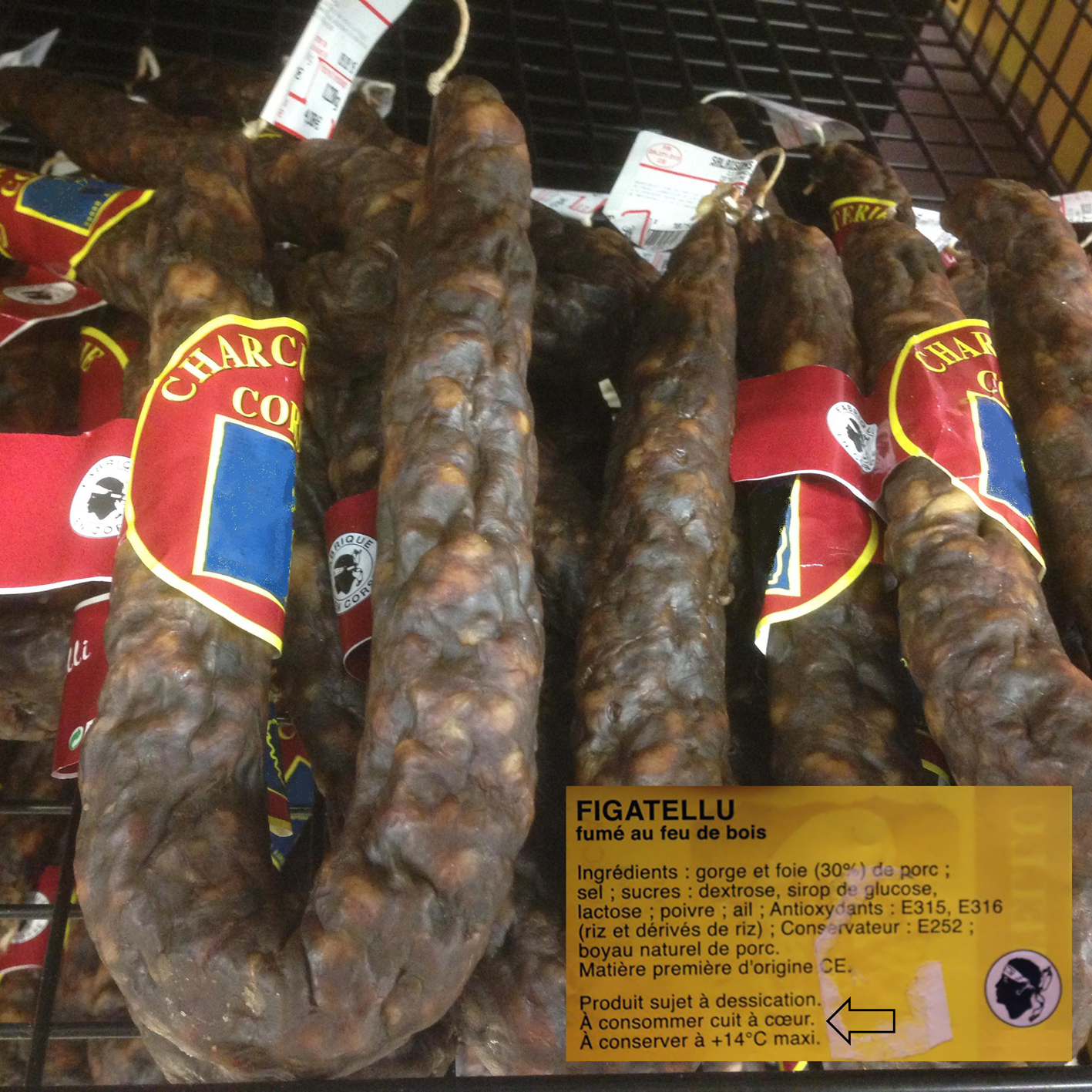
Pork sausages eaten raw by consumers caused an outbreak of trichinellosis in 2015 in France.

About 11 million humans are infected with Trichinella; T. spiralis is the species responsible for most of these infections. Infection was once very common, but this disease is now rare in the developed world. However, there were two known outbreaks in 2015. In the first outbreak, around 40 people were infected in Liguria, Italy, during a New Year's Eve celebration. The second outbreak in France was associated with pork sausages from Corsica, which were eaten raw, affecting 14 people in total. The incidence of trichinosis in the U.S. has decreased dramatically in the past century from an average of 400 cases per year mid-20th century down to an annual average of 20 cases per year (2008–10). The number of cases has decreased because of legislation prohibiting the feeding of raw meat garbage to hogs, increased commercial and home freezing of pork, and the public awareness of the danger of eating raw or undercooked pork products.

China reports around 10,000 cases every year and is the country with the highest number of cases. In China, between 1964 and 1998, over 20,000 people became infected with trichinosis, and more than 200 people died.

Trichinosis is common in developing countries where meat fed to pigs is raw or undercooked, but infections also arise in developed countries in Europe where raw or undercooked pork, wild boar, and horse meat may be consumed as delicacies.

In the developing world, most infections are associated with undercooked pork. For example, in Thailand, between 200 and 600 cases are reported annually around the Thai New Year. This is mostly attributable to a particular delicacy, larb, which calls for undercooked pork as part of the recipe.

In parts of Eastern Europe, the World Health Organization reports, some swine herds have trichinosis infection rates above 50%, with correspondingly large numbers of human infections.

=== United States ===
Historically, pork products were thought to have the most risk of infecting humans with T. spiralis. However, a trichinosis surveillance conducted between 1997 and 2001 showed a higher percentage of cases caused by consumption of wild game (the sylvatic transmission cycle). This is thought to be due to the Federal Swine Health Protection Act (Public Law 96-468) that was passed by Congress in 1980. Before this act, swine were fed garbage that could potentially be infected by T. spiralis. This act was put in place to prevent trichinella-contaminated food from being given to swine. Additionally, other requirements were put in place, such as rodent control, limiting commercial swine contact with wildlife, maintaining good hygiene, and removing dead pigs from pens immediately.

Between 2002 and 2007, 11 trichinosis cases were reported to the CDC each year on average in the United States, and 2008–10 averaged 20 cases per year; these were mostly the result of consuming undercooked game (sylvatic transmission) or home-reared pigs (domestic transmission).

=== Religious groups ===
The kashrut and halal dietary laws of Judaism and Islam prohibit eating pork. In the 19th century, when the association between trichinosis and undercooked pork was first established, this association was suggested to be the reason for the prohibition, reminiscent of the earlier opinion of medieval Jewish philosopher Maimonides that food forbidden by Jewish law was "unwholesome". This theory was controversial and eventually fell out of favor.

=== Reemergence ===
The disappearance of the pathogen from domestic pigs has led to a relaxation of legislation and control efforts by veterinary public health systems. Trichinosis has lately been thought of as a re-emerging zoonosis, supplemented by the increased distribution of meat products, political changes, a changing climate, and increasing sylvatic transmission.

Major sociopolitical changes can produce conditions that favor the resurgence of Trichinella infections in swine and, consequently, in humans. For instance, "the overthrow of the social and political structures in the 1990s" in Romania led to an increase in the incidence rate of trichinosis.

== History ==
As early as 1835, trichinosis was known to have been caused by a parasite, but the mechanism of infection was unclear at the time. A decade later, American scientist Joseph Leidy pinpointed undercooked meat as the primary vector for the parasite, and two decades afterward, this hypothesis was fully accepted by the scientific community.

=== Parasite ===
The circumstances surrounding the first observation and identification of T. spiralis are controversial, due to a lack of records. In 1835, James Paget, a first-year medical student, first observed the larval form of T. spiralis, while witnessing an autopsy at St. Bartholomew’s Hospital in London. Paget took a special interest in the presentation of muscle with white flecks, described as a "sandy diaphragm". Although Paget is most likely the first person to have noticed and recorded these findings, the parasite was named and published in a report by his professor, Richard Owen, who is now credited for the discovery of the T. spiralis larval form.

=== Lifecycle ===
A series of experiments conducted between 1850 and 1870 by the German researchers Rudolf Virchow, Rudolf Leuckart, and Friedrich Albert von Zenker, which involved feeding infected meat to a dog and performing the subsequent necropsy, led to the discovery of the lifecycle of Trichinella. Through these experiments, Virchow was able to describe the development and infectivity of T. spiralis.

== Research ==
The International Commission on Trichinellosis (ICT) was formed in Budapest in 1958. Its mission is to exchange information on the epidemiology, biology, pathophysiology, immunology, and clinical aspects of trichinosis in humans and animals. Prevention is a primary goal. Since the creation of the ICT, its members (more than 110 from 46 countries) have regularly gathered and worked together during meetings held every four years: the International Conference on Trichinellosis.

== See also ==
- List of parasites (human)
- Nurse cell
