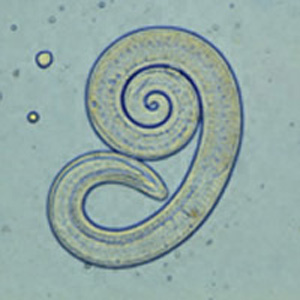
- Trichinella spiralis larva

Scientific classification
- Kingdom: Animalia
- Phylum: Nematoda
- Class: Enoplea
- Order: Trichocephalida
- Family: Trichinellidae

Genera
- Echinocoleus Lopez Neyra, 1947; Trichinella Railliet, 1895; Trichocephalus Roederer, 1761

= Trichinellidae =

Family of roundworms

The family Trichinellidae includes the genus Trichinella.

Trichinella species, which are also known as trichina worms, are responsible for the disease trichinosis.
