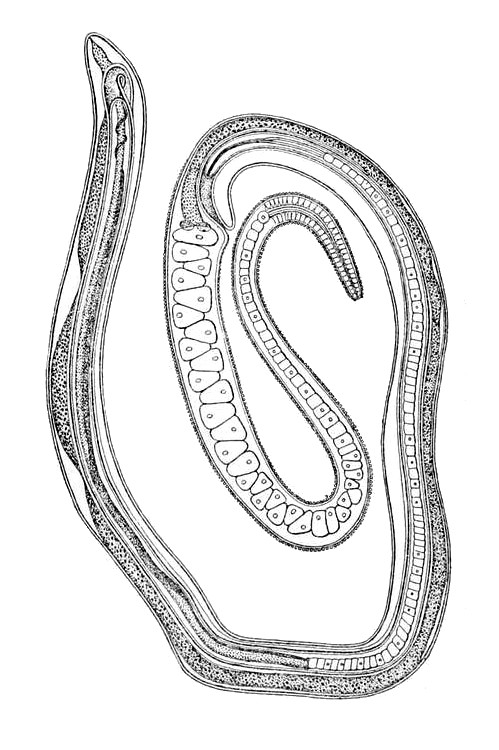
- Trichosomoides crassicauda, young female with male in vagina, drawing in Hall, 1916

Scientific classification
- Domain: Eukaryota
- Kingdom: Animalia
- Phylum: Nematoda
- Class: Enoplea
- Subclass: Dorylaimia
- Order: Trichocephalida

Families
- Anatrichosomatidae Yamaguti, 1961; Capillariidae Railliet, 1915; Cystoopsidae Skrjabin, 1923; Trichinellidae Ward, 1907; Trichosomoididae Hall, 1916; Trichuridae Ransom, 1911

Synonyms
- Trichinellida; Trichiurida

= Trichocephalida =

Order of roundworms

The Trichocephalida (Trichinellida or Trichurida in other classifications) is an order of parasitic nematodes.

== Taxonomy ==
The order Trichocephalida includes, according to modern classifications, the single suborder Trichinellina Hodda, 2007, which itself includes the single superfamily Trichinelloidea Ward, 1907, which itself includes 6 families:

- Family Anatrichosomatidae Yamaguti, 1961 (1 genus, 5 species) including the single genus Anatrichosoma
- Family Capillariidae Railliet, 1915 (1 subfamily, 18-22 genera according to classifications, 390 species) including Capillaria
- Family Cystoopsidae Skrjabin, 1923 (2 subfamilies, 2 genera, 7 species)
- Family Trichinellidae Ward, 1907 (4 genera, 16 species) including Trichinella
- Family Trichosomoididae Hall, 1916 (2 subfamilies, 5 genera, 25 species) including Huffmanela
- Family Trichuridae Ransom, 1911 (1 subfamily, 6 genera, 107 species) including Trichuris

Note that another slightly different arrangement of families exists, with the Family Trichosomoididae including Anatrichosoma in a subfamily Anatrichosomatinae.

== Biology ==
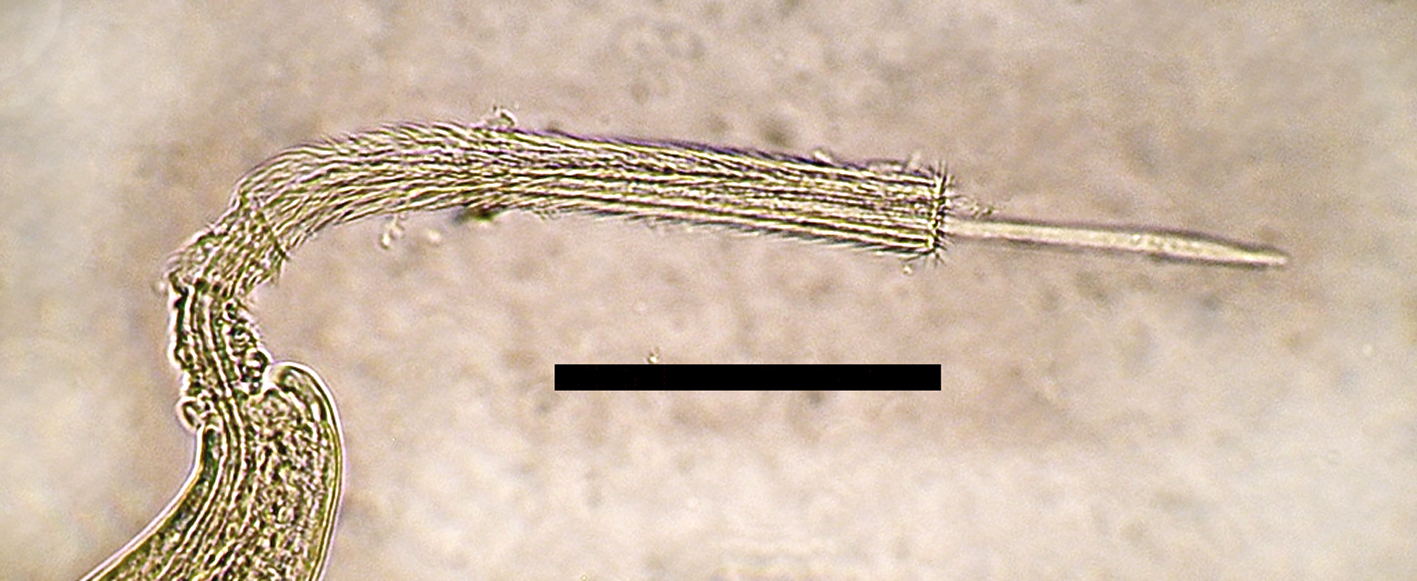
Male caudal extremity of Eucoleus aerophilus, the nematode causing pulmonary capillariasis in foxes. Bar = 50 μm

All members of this order are histiotrophic, meaning that in at least one stage of their life cycle, they develop in cells or tissues. They are all parasites in vertebrates in their adult stage. The anterior end is narrower than the posterior end in most of these worms, and the esophagus is slender and embedded in cells called stichocytes which form a stichosome. Eggs of members of this order have bipolar or biopercular plugs (except in a few species).
