= Tel Aviv University Institute of Archaeology =

Israeli archaeological research institute

Sonia and Marco Nadler Institute of Archaeology המכון לארכאולוגיה על שם סוניה ומרקו נדלר
- Other name: Tel Aviv University Institute of Archaeology
- Founder: Yohanan Aharoni
- Established: 1968; 58 years ago
- Director: Yuval Gadot
- Staff: 34 (as of 2024)
- Location: Tel Aviv, Israel
- Coordinates: 32°06′43.4″N 34°48′16.3″E
- Interactive map of Sonia and Marco Nadler Institute of Archaeology המכון לארכאולוגיה על שם סוניה ומרקו נדלר
- Website: en-humanities.tau.ac.il/Archaeology-institute

The Sonia and Marco Nadler Institute of Archaeology, known also as Tel Aviv University Institute of Archaeology, is a research facility at the Lester and Sally Entin Faculty of Humanities. Founded in 1968 by Yohanan Aharoni, the institute sponsors interdisciplinary and international fieldwork and research projects on ancient human societies of the Ancient Near East and the Mediterranean Sea. Fieldwork includes archaeological excavation and survey in key sites scattered all over Israel from prehistoric, biblical and classical periods. It is currently headed by Dafna Langgut (as of 2026).

The institute operates a library and a number of labs and studios for documentation, restoration and conservation of archaeological material as well specialized research labs such as zooarchaeology, archaeometallurgy, archaeomagnetism, paleoethnobotany, paleoecology, and Archaeoparasitology.

The Publication Department of the Institute provides printed and online framework for the publication of excavation reports and research, through four-book series and through Tel Aviv: The Journal of the Institute of Archaeology of Tel Aviv University.

== History and research ==
Shemuel Yeivin established the Department of Ancient Near Eastern Studies at Tel Aviv University in 1962. He was succeeded by Yohanan Aharoni of the Hebrew University of Jerusalem in 1968. Upon assuming the role as chair of the department, Aharoni established the Institute of Archaeology with the purpose of conducting archaeological fieldwork and research. The teaching staff of the department was incorporated into the newly formed institute. Throughout its history, the institute has sponsored archaeological excavation at sites such as Aphek-Antipatris, Tel Be'er Sheva, Tel Beit Shemesh, Tel Beit Yerah, Horashim East, Horvat Uza, Tel Ira, Jaffa, Jerusalem, Tel Jezreel, Tel Kabri, Kiriath-Jearim, Tel Lachish, Tel Malhata, Tel Moẓa, Wadi Qana, Nahal Zehora, Tel Kedesh, Ramat Raḥel and Yavne-Yam. The Institute of Archaeology of Tel Aviv University collaborates with Israeli Institute of Archaeology in salvage excavations projects across the country.

== Laboratories and facilities ==
Clickable map of all current excavation projects sponsored by the Institute of Archaeology of Tel Aviv University (as of 2024)

The Tel Aviv Institute of Archaeology operates a number of research facilities including laboratories, studios and collections.

=== Laboratories ===
- Laboratory of Zooarchaeology, headed by Lidar Sapir-Hen. Located in the Steinhardt Museum of Natural History. Analyzes ancient animal remains from archaeological excavations on prehistoric and historic sites.
- The Laboratory of Archaeometallurgy and Archaeomagnetic Research, headed by Erez Ben-Yosef. Collects and analyzes metallic materials from excavations and studies ancient mining and metalworking technologies, as well as archaeomagnetic dating studies.
- The Laboratory of Archaeobotany & Ancient Environments, headed by Dafna Langgut. Located in the Steinhardt Museum of Natural History. Focuses on the reconstruction of ancient vegetation and climates and their interrelation with humans, analysis of botanical material and parasite remains from archaeological excavations.
- Laboratory for Conservation of Metallic Artifacts. The lab specializes in conservation treatments for metallic objects such as coins, jewelry, weapons etc., for further research and for the conservation of cultural heritage.

=== Facilities ===
- The Institute and Department of Archaeology Library was established in 1968 by Gabriella Bachi and today stores thousands of printed books and offers access to sources in electronic form, mostly on subjects of archaeology and the Ancient Near East.
- Archaeological Graphic Documentation Studio. The studio specializes in illustrating finds and drawing architectural elements for research and publication purposes, as well as other graphic services for the institute.
- Restoration Laboratory. Specializes in restoring broken vessels made of clay, marble, glass and other materials.

== List of contemporary excavation projects ==
=== Apollonia-Arsuf Excavation Project ===
Apollonia-Arsuf is located on the Mediterranean coast, within the northern city limits of Herzliya. The fieldwork at the site began in 1976 as a salvage excavation and became an academic endeavor of the institute in 1982. The site shows a continuous occupation from the late 6th/early 5th century BCE through the 13th century CE. Research at the site includes surveys and excavations inside and outside the medieval walled town (the site's core settlement and hinterland), as well as underwater surveys and excavations in the sea off its archaeological remains. Recent seasons of excavations have been focused on the site's Byzantine and Crusader-period remains, within the medieval town and in the Crusader castle, whose destruction is dated to March–April 1265, never to be properly resettled ever since. Directed by Israel Roll (until 2006) and Oren Tal (since 2006).

=== Ashdod-Yam Archaeological Project ===
Ashdod-Yam is located on the Mediterranean coast, within the city limits of modern Ashdod and its ancient site Tel Ashdod. The site was inhabited primarily from the Late Bronze Age (15h-12th centuries BCE) and is identified with Asdudimmu, conquered by the Neo-Assyrian Empire in the late 8th century BCE. The site was known in Byzantine times as Azotos Paralios. The fieldwork started in 2013 and focuses on an Iron Age compound linked to the Assyrians, and a unique Byzantine church with early evidence of Georgian presence in the Holy Land. The project is directed by Alexander Fantalkin.

=== Lautenschläger Azekah Expedition ===
Tel Azekah (Tell Zakariya) is located in the Shephelah and yields occupational levels that span the Early Bronze Age to the Roman period. The site has revealed monumental remains from the Middle Bronze Age (c. 2000-1500 BCE) and key destruction contexts from the Late Bronze Age III (12th century BCE). The site shed light on the presence and history of the Kingdom of Judah in the region (10th-6th centuries BCE) and later settlements during the Persian, Hellenistic and Roman periods. Started in 2010, the expedition is directed by and Oded Lipschits, Manfred Oeming (Heidelberg University) and Sabine Kleiman

=== Tel Hadid Archaeological Project ===
Tel Hadid is located east of Lod in central Israel. The site dates to as early as the 3rd millennium BCE and yielded key finds related to Neo-Assyrian rule (8th–7th century BCE), Hellenistic period (4th–1st centuries BCE), and Byzantine period (4th–7th centuries CE), the Late Islamic period and the Modern Era (15th–20th century CE). The fieldwork, directed by Ido Koch and James Parker (NOBTS), began in 2018 and includes a survey and excavation at the site.

=== Givati Parking Lot Excavation (Jerusalem) ===
The renewed Givati Parking Lot excavation is a joint project between Tel Aviv and the Israel Antiquities Authority, started in 2017 and directed by Yuval Gadot and Yiftah Shalev (IAA). The site forms part of ancient Jerusalem. The site contains remains of public structures dating to between the late Iron Age (6th century BCE), through the Persian period and the Hasmonean period (2nd-1st century BCE). The renewed excavations seek to shed further light on the settlement history of ancient Jerusalem in these periods.

=== German-Israeli Tell Iẓṭabba Excavation Project ===
Tell Itzabba is located in northern Israel, within the city limits of Beit She'an, north of its ancient site. It is a multi-period site containing remains from as early as the Early Bronze Age (3rd millennium BCE) to the Early Islamic period (6th-11th centuries CE). It focuses on the study of Tell Iẓṭabba in Seleucid period, at the time known as "Nysa", and its relation to the later Roman settlement which formed part of the Decapolis. The project is directed by Oren Tal since 2019, and deals with the urban layout, infrastructure, water management and other aspects of the site. Among the topics studied are private architecture, as well as dietary habits during the Hellenistic period through archaeobotanical, archaeozoological and residue analysis studies.

=== Neustadter Masada Expedition ===
The site of Masada is a mountain fortress in the Judean Desert, known as a palace of Herod the Great from the late 1st century BCE and the last stronghold of the Jewish rebels during the First Jewish–Roman War. The renewed excavations are directed by Guy Stiebel since 2017, aim to shed light on the pre-Herodian periods at the site, as well as previously unknown remains from later periods, possibly the Early Islamic period.

=== Megiddo Expedition ===
Tel Megiddo is located in the Jezreel Valley in northern Israel. It is one of the most important sites in the history of the Levant, dating to as early as the 8th millennium BCE and serving as a key site throughout the entire Bronze and Iron Ages (c. 37th to 6th centuries BCE). Directed by Israel Finkelstein, Matthew J. Adams, and Mario A.S. Martin since 1994, the goals of the renewed excavations are to re-examine Tel Megiddo's stratigraphy and chronology as well as the development of new research methods such as Ancient DNA, geoarchaeology, scientific dating etc.

=== Tel Shaddud Regional Project ===
Tel Shaddud is located in the Jezreel Valley in northern Israel, around 10 km north-east of Megiddo. It is identified with a Canaanite town mentioned as śrt in ancient Egyptian sources from the time of Thutmose III and with the biblical town of Sarid, in the territory of the Tribe of Zebulun, which is mentioned in the Song of Deborah. The project started in 2022 and is directed by Omer Sergi, Karen Covello-Paran (Israel Antiquities Authority), Hannes Bezzel (University of Jena), Joachim Krause (Ruhr University Bochum).

=== Qadas Historical Excavation ===
Qadas was a Palestinian village depopulated in 1948, located next to the Israeli-Lebanese border. It is situated on Tel Qedesh and its study directed since 2021 by Raphael Greenberg and Gideon Sulimani is a collaboration with Hebrew University excavations there. The project engages in contemporary archaeology. It reveals the ruins of the village, abandoned during the 1948 Arab–Israeli war and demolished in 1966, as well as remains of a military base at the site associated with the Arab Liberation Army, and the remains of human activity at the site by tourists, military units, artists and pilgrims to a recently identified saint's tomb.

=== Qesem Cave Project ===
The Qesem Cave is a prehistoric site located in central Israel next to Rosh HaAyin. It yields items of the Acheulo-Yabrudian complex and is dated to between 420,000 and 200,000 BCE. The excavation began in 2001, directed by Avi Gopher (until 2016), Ran Barkai, Ella Assaf-Shpayer (Since 2023). It uncovered dental remains of an unknown archaic human, post-dating the Homo erectus and closely related to Anatomically Modern Humans. The research includes studies of geoarchaeology, prehistoric environment, dating and lithic technology.

=== Central Timna Valley Project (CTV) ===
The Timna Valley is located in the Arava region in southern Israel. The valley contains dozens of sites related to ancient copper mining dating to the Late Bronze Age to early Iron Age (13th-9th centuries BCE). The multi-disciplinary project, directed by Erez Ben-Yosef since 2012, aims to shed light on the geopolitical role of these mines and their relation to the New Kingdom of Egypt, the kingdoms of Israel, Judah and Edom. It includes studies of archaeomagnetism, archaeozoology, archaeobotany and paleoenvironment.

== Publications ==
The Publication Department of the Tel Aviv Institute of Archaeology has four-book series and one peer-reviewed periodical. The institute's publications are accessible online through EBSCO Information Services.

The Monograph Series of the Institute of Archaeology of Tel Aviv University (co-published with Eisenbrauns) is a platform mostly for the publication of final reports from excavations conducted by the institute. The platform has published 40 books between 1973 and 2021. As of 2022 the executive editors are Oded Lipschits and Oren Tal. Final reports on trial, salvage and rescue excavations are published in the Salvage Excavation Reports platform, which published 10 volumes between 2004 and 2017. As of 2024 the executive editor is Oren Tal. Occasional Publications has published five volumes between 1993 and 2021. Mosaics: Studies on Ancient Israel (co-published with Eisenbrauns) is a book series for thematic studies and collections of articles. It has published three volumes since 2021 and its executive editor is Oded Lipschits.

Tel Aviv: The Journal of the Institute of Archaeology of Tel Aviv University is a bi-annual peer-reviewed periodical that publishes articles on the archaeology and history of the Southern Levant. While the journal features articles dealing with periods ranging from prehistory to Late Antiquity, its primary focus is on the Bronze and Iron Ages. Tel Aviv was established in 1974 by Yohanan Aharoni. Since 2023, its editor-in-chief is Ido Koch.

== The Jacob M. Alkow Department of Archaeology and Ancient Near Eastern Cultures ==
Origin of current and past students in the international MA program (as of 2022): United States, Canada, Mexico, Chile, Puerto Rico, South Africa, Cameroon, United Kingdom, Sweden, Germany, Switzerland, Hungary, Slovakia, Greece, Russia, China, Hong Kong, South Korea, India, Australia, Israel

The Jacob M. Alkow Department of Archaeology and Ancient Near Eastern Cultures is part of The Lester and Sally Entin Faculty of Humanities at Tel Aviv University. The department teaches students for a Bachelor's degree in Archaeology of the Southern Levant and Ancient Near Eastern Cultures; Master's degree in these fields as well as Archaeology, Archaeological Materials (with a scientific-technologic focus) and Ancient Israel studies which combines archaeological, biblical and historical studies and focuses on the ancient history of the Jewish people. Since 2011 the department has also operated the International MA program for foreign students. Ph.D. studies in the department are conducted under The Chaim Rosenberg School of Jewish Studies and Archaeology. The current chair of the Department is Lidar Sapir-Hen (as of 2024). The academic staff consists of 17 faculty members (as of 2024), including professors and senior lecturers in prehistoric, biblical, classical and historic archaeology, Egyptology, Hittitology and Assyriology.
