= Paleoparasitology =

Study of prehistoric parasites

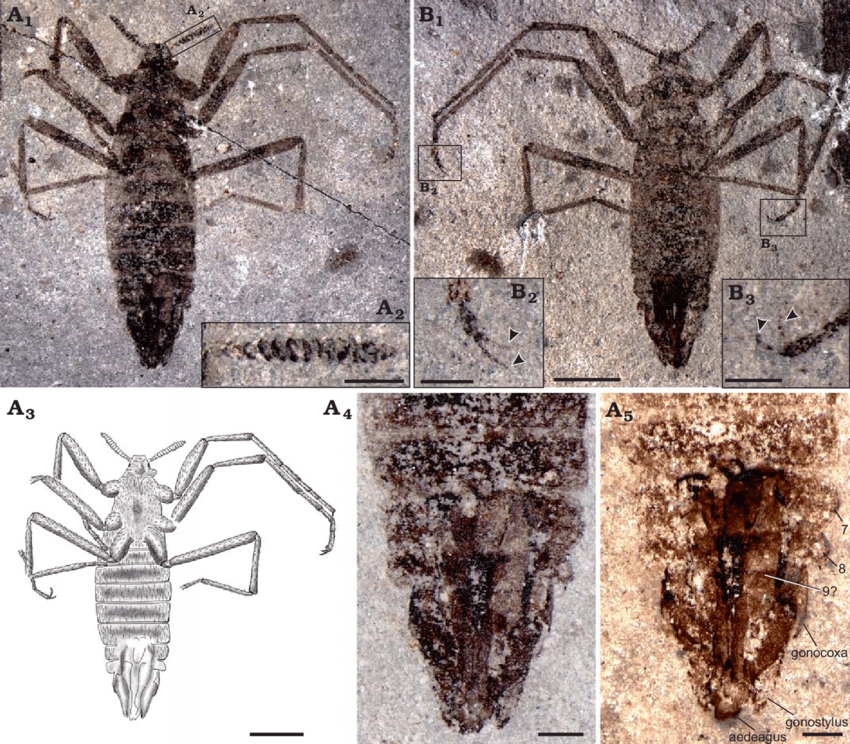
Saurophthirus, an ectoparasitic Cretaceous insect

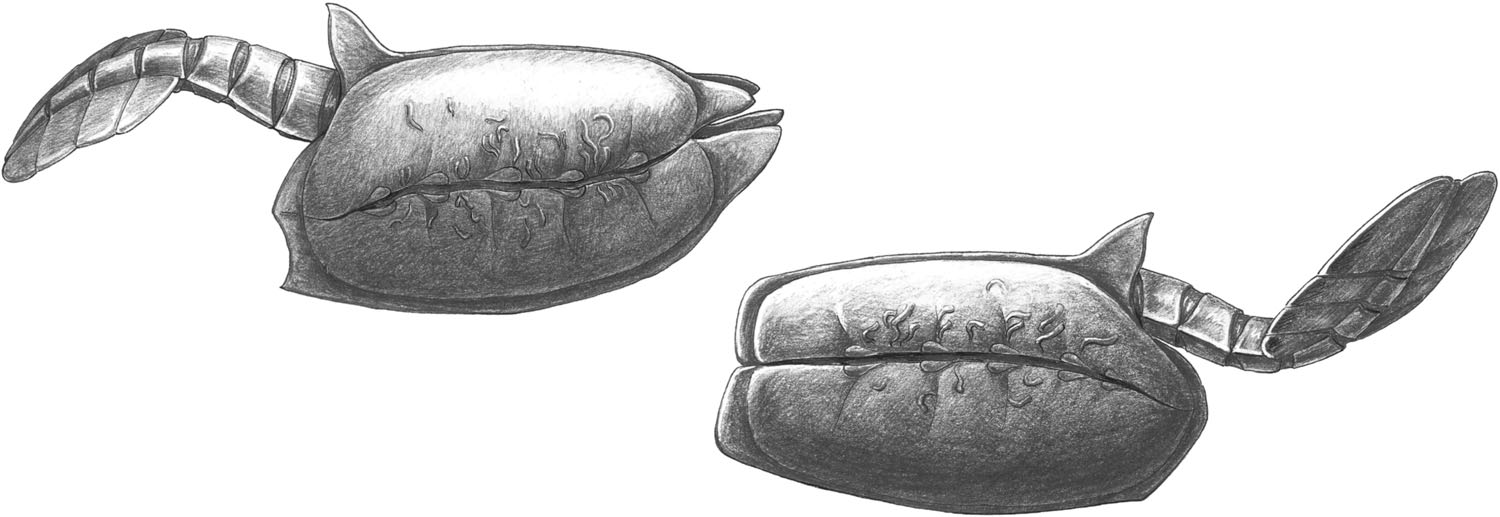
Vetulicola species infected by Vermilituus gregarius

Paleoparasitology (or "palaeoparasitology") is the study of parasites from the past, and their interactions with hosts and vectors; it is a subfield of paleontology, the study of living organisms from the past. Some authors define this term more narrowly, as "Paleoparasitology is the study of parasites in archaeological material." (p. 103) K.J. Reinhard suggests that the term "archaeoparasitology" be applied to "... all parasitological remains excavated from archaeological contexts ... derived from human activity" and that "the term 'paleoparasitology' be applied to studies of nonhuman, paleontological material." (p. 233) This article follows Reinhard's suggestion and discusses the protozoan and animal parasites of non-human animals and plants from the past, while those from humans and our hominid ancestors are covered in archaeoparasitology.

== Sources of material ==
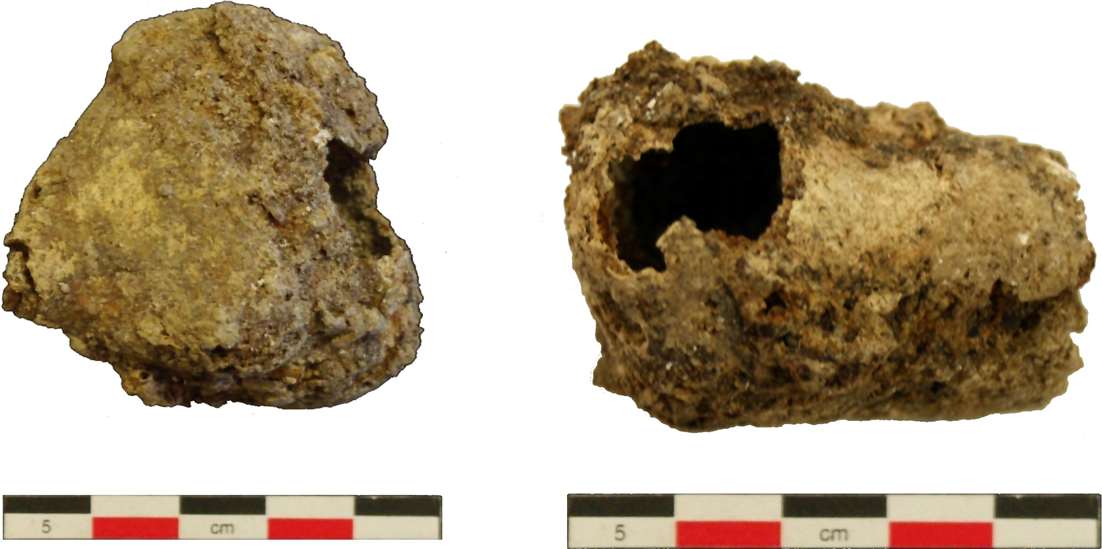
Cysts found in a corpse in a late Roman grave in France, interpreted as signs of probable hydatidosis and capillariasis

The primary sources of paleoparasitological material include mummified tissues, coprolites (fossilized dung) from mammals or dinosaurs, fossils, and amber inclusions. Hair, skins, and feathers also yield ectoparasite remains. Some archaeological artifacts document the presence of animal parasites. One example is the depiction of what appear to be mites in the ear of a "hyaena-like" animal in a tomb painting from ancient Thebes.

Some parasites leave marks or traces (ichnofossils) on host remains, which persist in the fossil record in the absence of structural remains of the parasite. Parasitic ichnofossils include plant remains which exhibit characteristic signs of parasitic insect infestation, such as galls or leaf mines and certain anomalies seen in invertebrate endoskeletal remains.

Plant and animal parasites have been found in samples from a broad spectrum of geological periods, including the Holocene (samples over 10,000 years old), Pleistocene (over 550,000 years old), Eocene (over 44 million years old), Cretaceous (over 100 million years) and even Lower Cambrian (over 500 million years).

== Evidence of parasitism ==
One of the most daunting tasks involved in studying parasitic relationships from the past is supporting the assertion that the relationship between two organisms is indeed parasitic. Organisms living in "close association" with each other may exhibit one of several different types of trophic relationships, such as parasitism, mutualism, and commensalism. Demonstration of true parasitism between existing species typically involves observing the harmful effects of parasites on a presumed host. Experimental infection of the presumed host, followed by recovery of viable parasites from that host, also supports any claim of true parasitism. Obviously such experiments are not possible with specimens of extinct organisms found in paleontological contexts.

Assumptions of true parasitism in paleontological settings which are based on analogy to known present-day parasitic relationships ,may not be valid, ue to h⁣⁣host-specificity⁣⁣. Fo example, Trypanosoma brucei gambiense and Trypanosoma brucei rhodesiense are both devastating human parasites, but the related subspecies Trypanosoma brucei brucei will infect a number of animal hsts, but cannot even survive in the human blsood tream, much less reproduce and infect a human h ost. So a related (or unidentifiable) species of Trypanosoma found in a paleontological or archaeological context may not be a true human parasite, even though it appears identical (or very similar) to the modern parasitic forms.

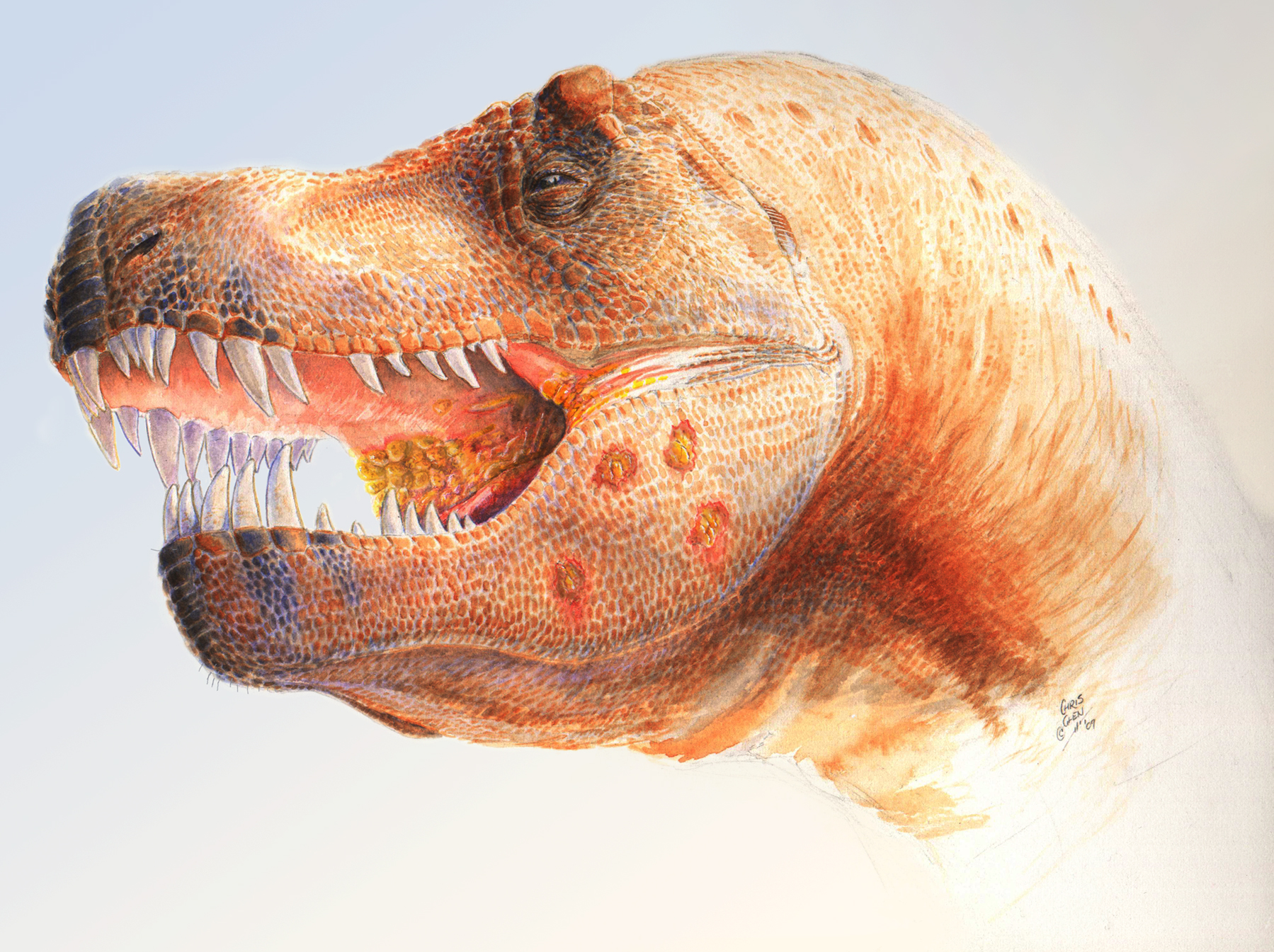
Restoration of a Tyrannosaurus head with holes possibly caused by a Trichomonas-like parasite

The most convincing evidence of paleoparasitism is obtained when a presumed parasite is found in direct association with its presumed host, in a context that is consistent with known host-parasite associations. Some examples include helminths caught in amber in the process of escaping from the body of an insect , lice found in the fur of guinea pig mummies , protozoans in the alimentary canal of flies in amber, nematode larvae found embedded in animal coprolites , and a mite caught in amber in the process of apparently feeding on a spider. In 2023, nematode eggs and possibly protozoan cysts were found in the Late Triassic coprolite of phytosaur. Some holes in the mandibles of several specimens of Tyrannosaurus may have been caused by Trichomonas-like parasites.

Fossil organisms that are related to present-day parasites often possess the morphological features associated with a parasitic lifestyle, such as blood-feeding mouthparts. So fossil ticks and hematophagous insects are generally assumed to be ectoparasites, even when their remains are found in the absence of a host. The ancient flea Saurophthirus found in Early Cretaceous deposits had a sucking proboscis and a stretching abdomen, which indicates the parasitic lifestyle of this insect.

The presence of structures resembling leaf miner trails in leaf fossils provides indirect evidence of parasitism, even if remains of the parasite are not recovered. The dramatic tissue aberrations seen in present-day plant galls and gall-like structures in some invertebrates are direct physiological reactions to the presence of either metazoan parasites or microbial pathogens. Similar structures seen in fossil plant and invertebrate remains are often interpreted as evidence of paleoparasitism.

Host-parasite interactions today are often exploited by other species, and similar examples have been found in the fossil record of plant galls and leaf mines. For example, there are species of wasps, called inquilines, which are unable to induce their own plant galls, so they simply take up residence in the galls that are made by other wasps. Another example is the predation of plant galls, or leaf mines, to eat the trapped insect larva inside the gall or mine.

== Knowledge gained from ancient animal and plant parasites ==
Studies of parasite remains and traces from the past have yielded a catalog of ancient host-parasite associations. Additionally, genetic sequence data obtained directly from ancient animal parasites, and inferences of past relationships based on genetic sequences of existing parasite groups are being applied to paleoparasitological questions. Data obtained by all of these methods have improved our understanding of the origin and evolution of the parasites themselves and their vectors, and of the host-parasite and vector-parasite associations.

In some cases, presumed host-parasite relationships of the past seem quite different from those known in the present, such as a fly which appears to be a parasite of a mite.

Paleoparasitological studies have also provided insight into questions outside the realm of parasitology. Examples include the migration and phylogeography of marine mammal hosts, the identity of domestic animal bones based on the known hosts of parasite remains found at the site, and the possible role of climatic changes on animal host genetic diversity.
