= Tel Aviv (journal) =

- Discipline: Archaeology of the Southern Levant and Near East
- Language: English
- Edited by: Ido Koch

Publication details
- History: 1974–present
- Publisher: Routledge
- Frequency: Biannual

Standard abbreviations
- ISO 4: Tel Aviv

Indexing
- ISSN: 0334-4355 (print); 2040-4786 (web)

Tel Aviv is the journal of the Tel Aviv University Institute of Archaeology. It is a biannual peer-reviewed academic journal published by Routledge. It publishes articles on recent archaeological research in the Southern Levant and studies in Near Eastern archaeology. While its main focus is the second and first millennia BCE, the journal features articles dealing with the prehistoric periods and as late as the late antiquity.

== See also ==
- Archaeology of Israel

Publications from the same field

- Ancient Near East studies: journals, sources and lexicons & their abbreviated names
- Hebrew University of Jerusalem, Institute of Archaeology publications
  - Jerusalem Journal of Archaeology
  - Qedem: Monographs of the Institute of Archaeology
  - Qedem Reports
- Israel Antiquities Authority: Publications
  - IAA Reports monograph series (English)
  - Atiqot / עתיקות (Hebrew and English)
  - Hadashot Arkheologiyot – Excavations and Surveys in Israel (Hebrew and English)
  - Qadmoniot: see under Israel Exploration Society
- Israel Exploration Society): Periodicals and Series
  - Israel Exploration Journal
  - Qadmoniot: A Journal for the Antiquities of Eretz-Israel and Bible (Hebrew quarterly), together with Israel Antiquities Authority
  - Eretz-Israel: Archaeological, Historical and Geographical Studies (Hebrew and English), festschrift series
