= Yohanan Aharoni =

Israeli archaeologist and historical geographer (1919–1976)

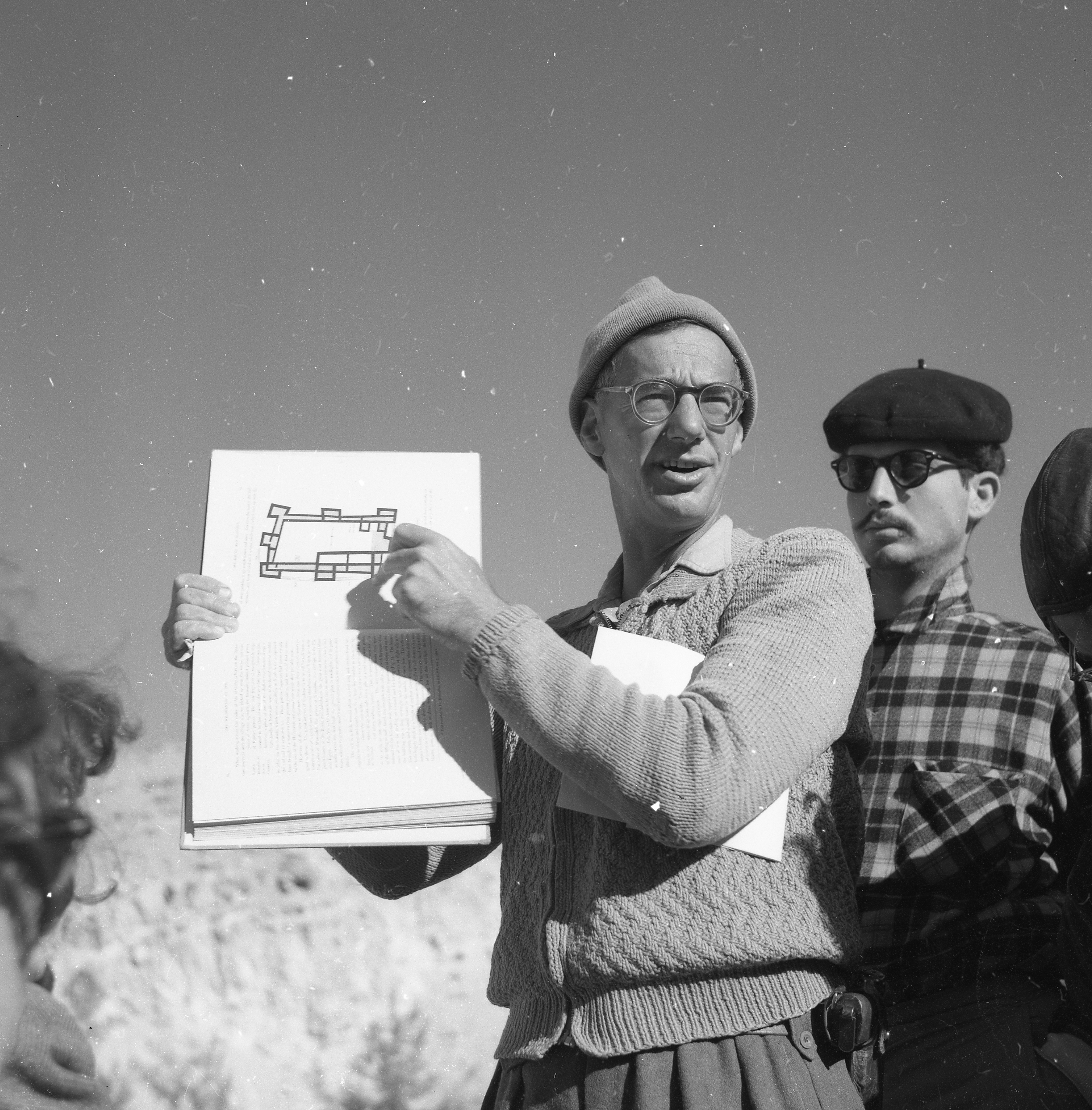
Aharoni on an archaeological tour of Har Karkom mountain, 1954. Photo by Beno Rothenberg.

Yohanan Aharoni (Hebrew: יוחנן אהרוני; 7 June 1919 – 9 February 1976) was a German-born Israeli archaeologist and historical geographer, chairman of the Department of Near East Studies and chairman of the Institute of Archaeology at Tel Aviv University.

== Life ==
Born to the Aronheim family, in Germany on 7 June 1919, Aharoni immigrated to Mandatory Palestine in 1933. He studied at the Hebrew Reali School in Haifa, and later at the Mikve Yisrael agricultural school. He married Miriam Gross and became a member of kibbutz Alonim, where he lived until 1947.

== Career ==
Aharoni studied archaeology at the Hebrew University of Jerusalem and began to teach there in 1954. By 1966, he became a professor at the university. However, in 1968, he moved to Tel Aviv University and replaced Shemuel Yeivin as chairman of the Department of Near East Studies. Together with his student Moshe Kochavi, his academic staff from his archaeological projects, and the teaching staff of the Department, Aharoni established the Tel Aviv University Institute of Archaeology, with the purpose of conducting archaeological fieldwork and research.

Aharoni participated in many excavations, including Ramat Rachel, Tel Arad, Tel Be'er Sheva, Tel Hazor and Lachish. He also studied ancient roadways in the Negev, and participated in the discovery of the Bar Kokhba caves while surveying and excavating the Dead Sea region in 1953.

== Publications ==
In addition to numerous articles published in archaeological journals, Aharoni wrote several books:

- The Land of the Bible: A Historical Geography (1967); original Hebrew edition: 'Land of Israel in Biblical Times - Historical Geography', Bialik Institute (1962)
- Beer-Sheba I: Excavations at Tel Beer-Sheba, 1969-1971 (1973)
- Investigations at Lachish: The sanctuary and the residency (1975)
- The Arad Inscriptions with Joseph Naveh (1981) - English version
- Macmillan Bible Atlas with Michael Avi-Yonah (1993)
- Carta Bible Atlas (2002)
- The Archaeology of the Land of Israel (1978)
