= Moshe Kochavi =

Israeli archaeologist (1928–2008)

- משה כוכבי
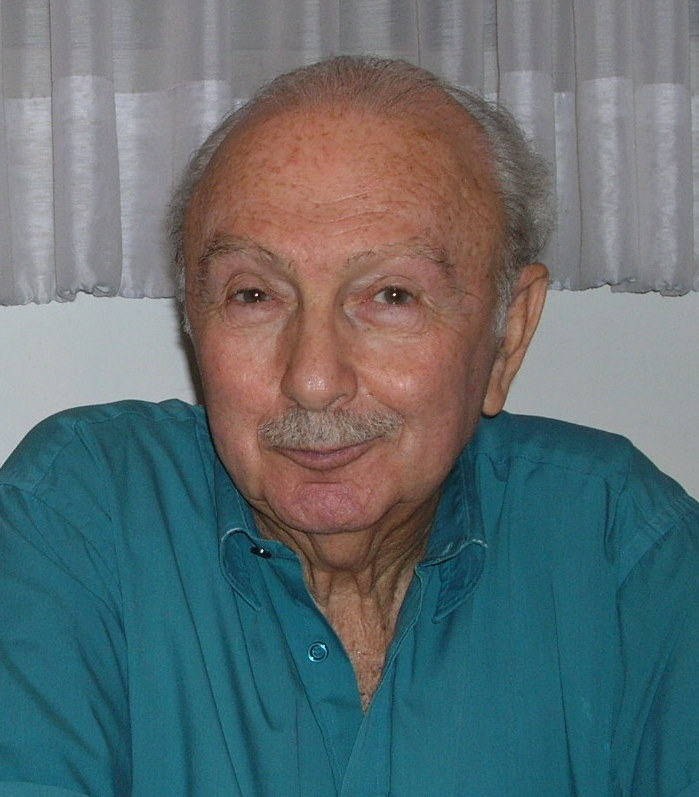
- Born: 1928; Bucharest, Romania
- Died: 2008 (aged 79–80); Israel
- Known for: founding faculty member of Tel Aviv University's Department of Archaeology and Near Eastern Studies
- Scientific career
- Fields: Archeology of Israel

Moshe Kochavi (Hebrew: משה כוכבי; 1928–2008) was an Israeli archaeologist and a founding faculty member of Tel Aviv University's Department of Archaeology and Near Eastern Studies.

== Biography ==
Born in Bucharest, Romania, Kochavi (birth surname: Stern) immigrated to Palestine with his parents at the age of 5. Kochavi joined the Palmach in 1947. He fought with the Yiftach Brigade and was wounded during Operation Yoav.

Kochavi began studying archaeology at the Hebrew University of Jerusalem in 1955 under Yohanan Aharoni, going on to receive his Ph.D. from that institution. After the 1967 Six-Day War Kochavi carried out the first comprehensive survey of the Judean Hills. In 1968 he joined Aharoni in the Tel Aviv University's Department of Archaeology and helped establish the new archaeological institute. He led Tel Aviv University's excavation at Tel Hadar between 1987 and 1995 as part of the Land of Geshur Project.

Kochavi was one of numerous archaeologists who in 2007 petitioned the Supreme Court of Israel to order an immediate cessation of digging operations being performed by the Jerusalem Islamic Waqf on the Temple Mount.

== Works ==
- Kochavi, Moshe, ed. (1972). Judea Samaria and the Golan – the archaeological survey of 1968. Jerusalem: The Archaeological Survey of Israel and Carta.

== See also ==
- Archeology of Israel
- Rujm el-Hiri
