= Archaeoparasitology =

Study of parasites in archaeological contexts

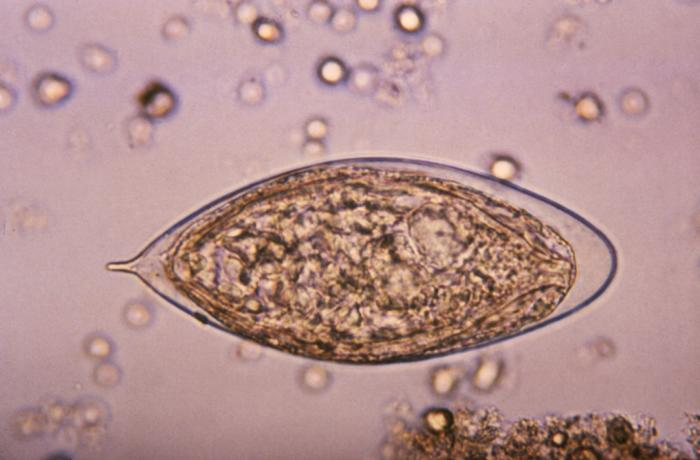
Schistosoma haematobium egg

Archaeoparasitology, a multi-disciplinary field within paleopathology, is the study of parasites in archaeological contexts. It includes studies of the protozoan and metazoan parasites of humans in the past, as well as parasites which may have affected past human societies, such as those infesting domesticated animals.

Reinhard suggested that the term "archaeoparasitology" be applied to "... all parasitological remains excavated from archaeological contexts ... derived from human activity" and that "the term 'paleoparasitology' be applied to studies of nonhuman, paleontological material." (p. 233) Paleoparasitology includes all studies of ancient parasites outside of archaeological contexts, such as those found in amber, and even dinosaur parasites.

The first archaeoparasitology report described calcified eggs of Bilharzia haematobia (now Schistosoma haematobium) from the kidneys of an ancient Egyptian mummy. Since then, many fundamental archaeological questions have been answered by integrating our knowledge of the hosts, life cycles and basic biology of parasites, with the archaeological, anthropological and historical contexts in which they are found.

== Parasitology basics ==
Parasites are organisms which live in close association with another organism, called the host, in which the parasite benefits from the association, to the detriment of the host. Many other kinds of associations may exist between two closely allied organisms, such as commensalism or mutualism.

Endoparasites (such as protozoans and helminths), tend to be found inside the host, while ectoparasites (such as ticks, lice and fleas) live on the outside of the host body. Parasite life cycles often require that different developmental stages pass sequentially through multiple host species in order to successfully mature and reproduce. Some parasites are very host-specific, meaning that only one or a few species of hosts are capable of perpetuating their life cycle. Others are not host-specific, since many different hosts appear to harbor and pass on the infective stages of the parasite.

Most archaeoparasitology reports involve species which are considered to be true parasites of humans today. However, incidental parasitism (referred to by some authors as "pseudoparasitism", "false parasitism" or "accidental parasitism") occurs when a parasite which does not normally utilize a host for the perpetuation of its lifecycle is found in that host incidentally. One example is finding the eggs of Cryptocotyle lingua (a fish parasite) in the stomach contents of an Eskimo mummy. It is estimated that 70% of the "parasite" species reported from present-day humans are actually only incidental parasites. Some incidental parasites do cause harm to the infested pseudohosts.

== Sources of material ==
In archaeological contexts, endoparasites (or their eggs or cysts) are usually found in (i) fossilized human or animal dung (coprolites), (ii) the tissues and digestive contents of mummified corpses, or (iii) soil samples from latrines, cesspits, or middens (dumps for domestic waste). A cyst of Echinococcus granulosus was even retrieved from cemetery soil in Poland. Ectoparasites may be found on the skin or scalp, as well as wigs, clothing, or personal grooming accessories found in archaeological sites. Ectoparasite eggs may be found attached to individual hairs. The International Ancient Egyptian Mummy Tissue Bank in Manchester, England, provides tissue samples for a variety of uses, including parasitological studies.

Since 1910, parasite remains have been found in archaeological samples from Africa, the Americas, Asia, Europe, the Middle East, and New Zealand. The age of archaeological sites yielding human parasite remains ranges from approx. 25,000-30,000 years ago to late 19th-early 20th century. Parasite remains have also been found in domestic animal remains at archaeological sites.

Human skeletal remains may exhibit indirect evidence of parasitism. For example, hookworm (Ancyslostoma duodenale) parasitism may lead to anemia, and anemia is one factor associated with the skeletal changes of cribra orbitalia and porotic hyperostosis. Thus, hookworm parasitism may be a causal factor in observed cribra orbitalia and porotic hyperostosis, though dietary factors may also lead to anemia.

Information on the presence of intermediate hosts, required for life cycle completion by many parasites, is also useful in determining the likelihood that a parasite may have infected a particular ancient society. One example is the identification of molluscan intermediate hosts of schistosomiasis in an Islamic archaeological context.

Artifacts depicting the appearance of individuals may also indicate cases of parasitism. Examples include the characteristic facial deformities of leishmaniasis found on pre-Columbian Mochica pottery, and morphological features of certain ancient Egyptian figurative art. Literary sources also provide valuable information regarding not only the parasites present in historic societies, but also the knowledge and attitudes that the people had towards their parasitic infestations. However, specific parasitological diagnoses reported in ancient and medieval texts must always be read with some degree of skepticism.

== Techniques and methods ==
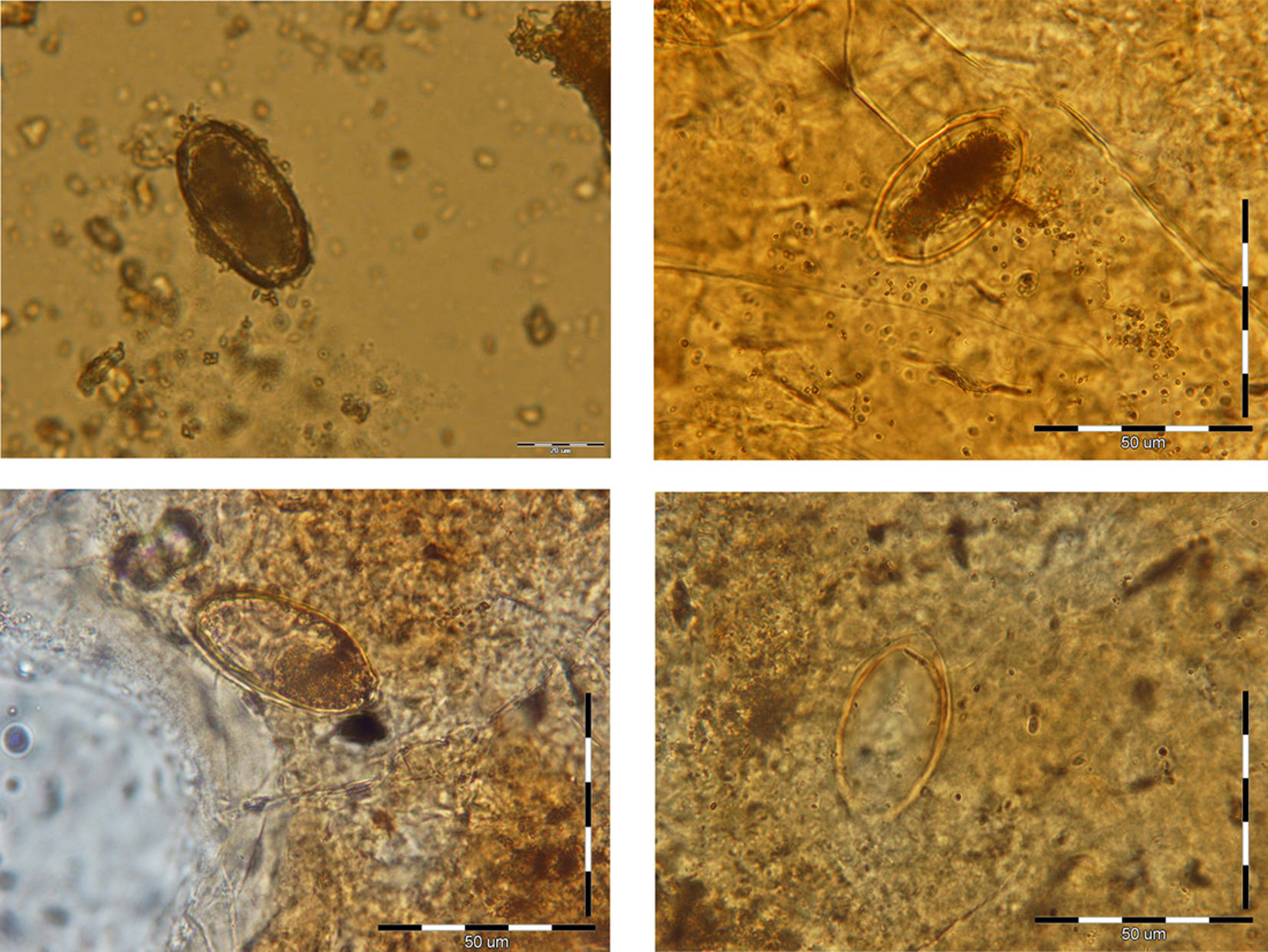
Capillaria hepatica eggs from the corpse of an adolescent from the late Roman period in France, treated with petrographic methods

Parasite remains in archaeological samples are identified by a variety of techniques. Very durable remains, such as eggs and cysts, may remain intact for many thousands of years. In some cases, relatively intact soft-bodied adult helminths and ectoparasitic arthropods have been found. All of these forms can be identified to the family, genus or species level by compound or electron microscopy.
Petrographic techniques have been used for eggs of Capillaria hepatica found in cysts in the corpse of an adolescent from the late Roman period buried in Amiens (France). The authors stated that identification of tissue-dwelling parasites such as Capillaria hepatica in archaeological remains is particularly dependent on preservation conditions and taphonomic changes and should be interpreted with caution due to morphological similarities with Trichuris sp. eggs

In cases where the intact bodies of parasites are not found, protein or DNA from the parasite may still be present. Antigenic and immunological assays (including enzyme-linked immunoassay - ELISA,), and DNA sequencing are used to identify the source of these chemical remains, often to the species level.

== Fundamental questions ==
Archaeoparasitological studies have provided information on many fundamental archaeological, historical, and biogeographical questions. These questions may be grouped into the following broad categories: past dietary and farming practices, animal domestication, migration patterns, climate change, sanitary practices, cultural contacts, ethnomedicine, and the overall health of various human societies. Archaeoparasitology data, combined with our knowledge of present host-parasite associations, also contributes to our understanding of the co-evolution of human host-parasite interactions. Our understanding of the geographic origins, evolution and biogeography of the parasites themselves and human diseases associated with them has also benefitted from archaeoparasitological studies.
