= Antipatris =

First century BCE city

- אנטיפטריס
- Tel Afek, and Kŭlảt Râs el ’Ain, the castle of the spring-head
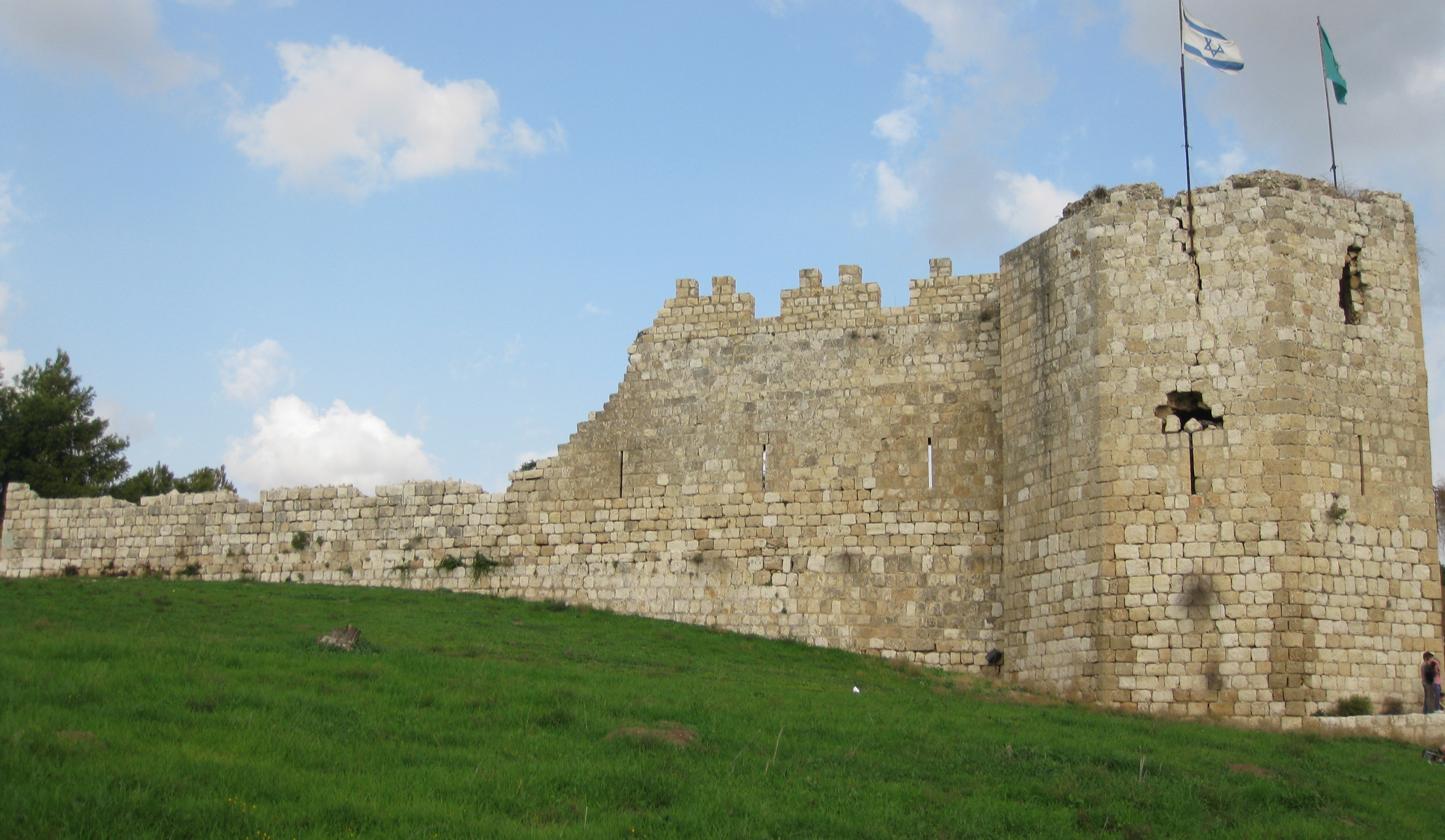

- Location within Central Israel Location within Israel
- 32°06′18″N 34°55′49.5″E
- Type: Settlement
- Location: Central District, Israel
- Region: Levant
- Grid position: 144/167 PAL

Site notes
- Condition: In ruins

Antipatris /ænˈtɪpətrɪs/ (Hebrew: אנטיפטריס, Ancient Greek: Ἀντιπατρίς) was a city built during the first century BC by Herod the Great, who named it in honour of his father, Antipater. The site, now a national park in central Israel, was inhabited from the Chalcolithic period to the Late Roman period. The remains of Antipatris are known in Modern Hebrew as Tel Afek (תל אפק), and in Arabic as Khulat Rās al-‘Ayn ('castle of the head of the spring'), after the nearby riverhead of the Yarkon. It has been identified as either the tower of Aphek mentioned by Josephus, or the biblical Aphek, best known from the story of the Battle of Aphek. During the Crusader period the site was known as Surdi fontes, "Silent springs". The Ottoman fortress known as Binar Bashi or Ras al-Ayn was built there in the 16th century.

Antipatris/Tel Afek lies at the strong perennial springs of the Yarkon River, which throughout history has created an obstacle between the hill country to the east and the Mediterranean to the west, forcing travellers and armies to pass through the narrow Afek Pass between the springs and the foothills of Samaria. This gave the location of Antipatris/Tel Afek its strategic importance.

Antipatris was situated on the Roman road from Caesarea Maritima to Jerusalem, north of the town of Lod where the road turned eastwards towards Jerusalem. During the British Mandate, a water pumping station was built there to channel water from the Yarkon to Jerusalem.

Today the remains of Antipatris are located roughly between Petah Tikva and the towns of Kafr Qasim and Rosh HaAyin (literally "headspring"), south of Hod HaSharon.

== History ==
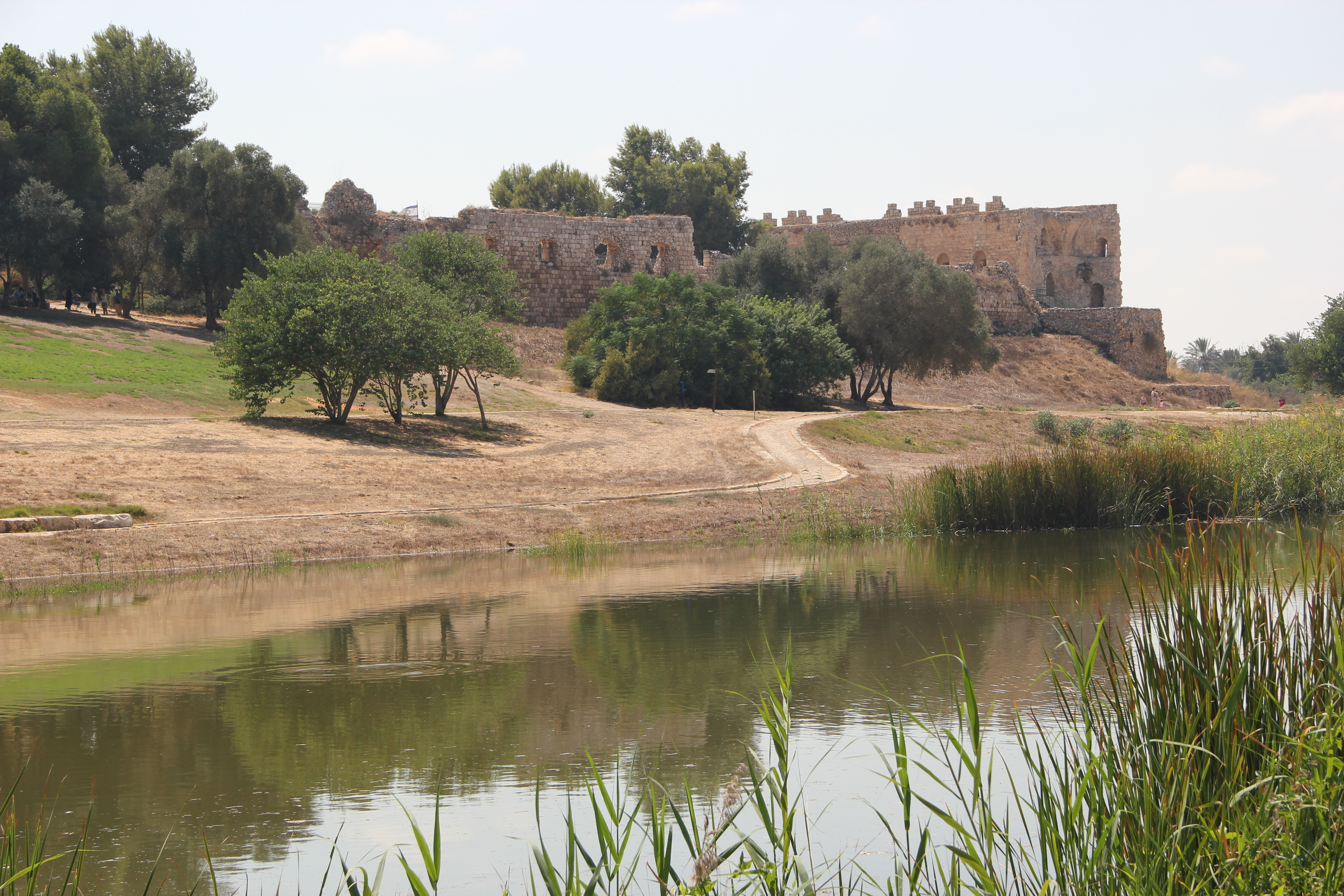
Tel Afek

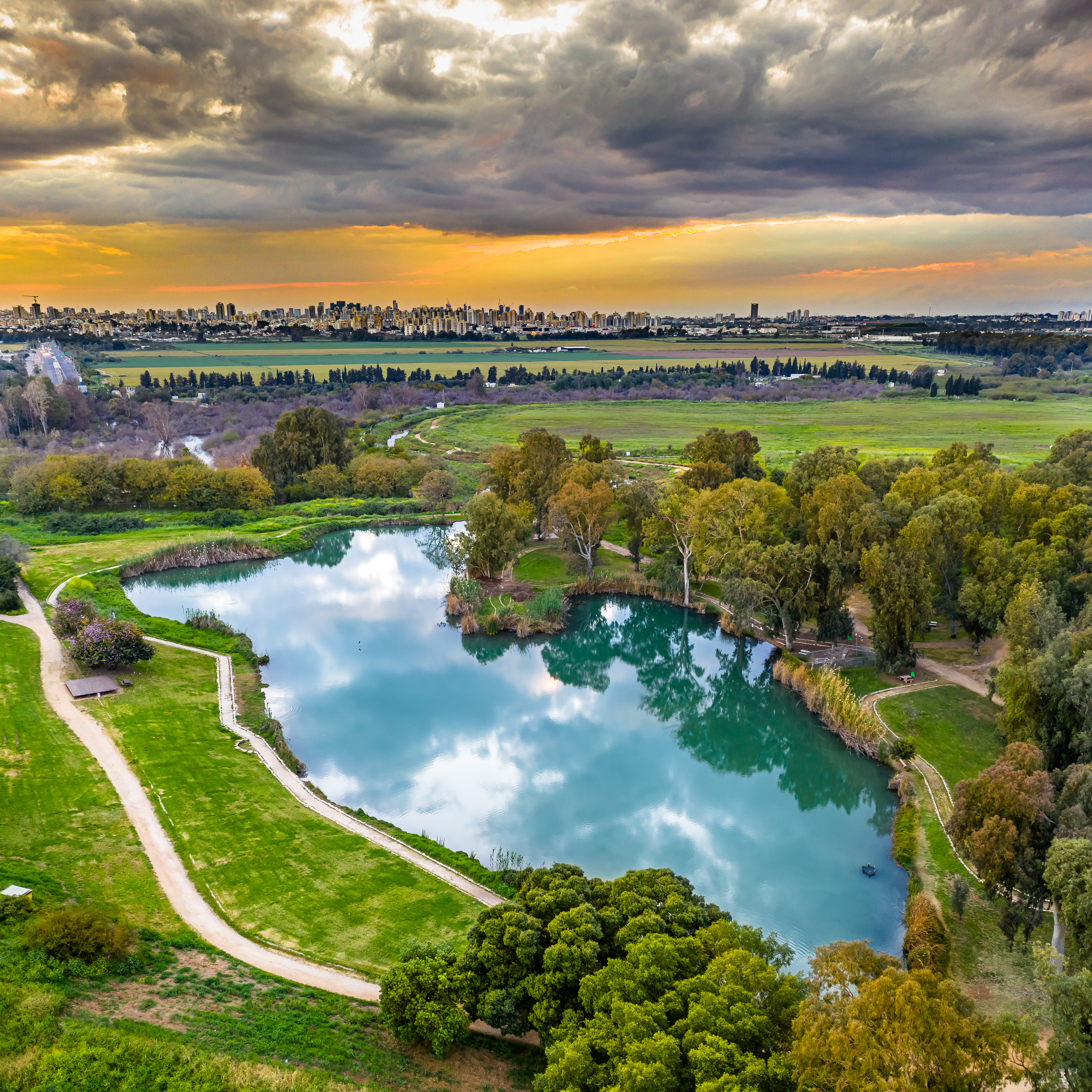

=== Aphek ===
The Bronze Age saw the construction of defensive walls, 2.5 metres (8.2 ft) to 3.5 metres (11 ft) wide, and a series of palaces. One of these is described as an Egyptian governor residence of the 15th century BC, and within, an array of cuneiform tablets were found. Philistine ware is found in the site in 12th century BC layers.

Most scholars agree that there were more than one Aphek. While Tel-Aphek (Antipatris) is one of them, C.R. Conder identified the Aphek of Eben-Ezer with a ruin (Khirbet) some 3.7 miles (6 km) distant from Dayr Aban (believed to be Eben-Ezer), and known by the name Marj al-Fikiya; the name al-Fikiya being an Arabic corruption of Aphek. Eusebius, when writing about Eben-ezer in his Onomasticon, says that it is "the place from which the Gentiles seized the Ark, between Jerusalem and Ascalon, near the village of Bethsamys (Beit Shemesh)," a locale that corresponds with Conder's identification.

The historian Josephus mentions a certain tower called Aphek, not far from Antipatris, and which was burnt by a contingent of Roman soldiers.

=== Antipatris ===
Antipatris was a city built by Herod the Great, and named in honor of his father, Antipater II of Judea. It lay between Caesarea Maritima and Lydda, on the great Roman road from Caesarea to Jerusalem, and figures prominently in Roman-era history. Today, the nearby river bears the town's old namesake in Arabic (Arabic: نهر أبو فطرس, romanized: Nahr Abū Fiṭrus).

According to Josephus, Antipatris was built on the site of an older town that was formerly called Chabarzaba (Hebrew: כפר סבא), a place so-named in classical Jewish literature and in the Mosaic of Rehob. During the outbreak of the Jewish war with Rome in 66 CE, the Roman army under Cestius was routed as far as Antipatris.

Paul the Apostle was brought by night from Jerusalem to Antipatris and next day from there to Caesarea Maritima, to stand trial before the governor Antonius Felix; see Acts of the Apostles 23:31-32

In 363, the city was badly damaged by an earthquake. Only one of the early bishops of the Christian bishopric of Antipatris, a suffragan of Caesarea, is mentioned by name in extant documentation: Polychronius, who was present both at the Robber Council of Ephesus in 449 and the Council of Chalcedon in 451. No longer a residential bishopric, Antipatris is today listed by the Catholic Church as a titular see.

On 27 April 750, the Abbasid general Abd Allah ibn Ali, uncle of Caliph al-Saffah (r. 750–754), marched to Antipatris ('Abu Futrus'). There, he summoned around eighty members of the Umayyad dynasty, whom the Abbasids had toppled earlier that year, with promises of fair surrender terms, only to have them massacred.

=== Ottoman Ras al-Ayn ===
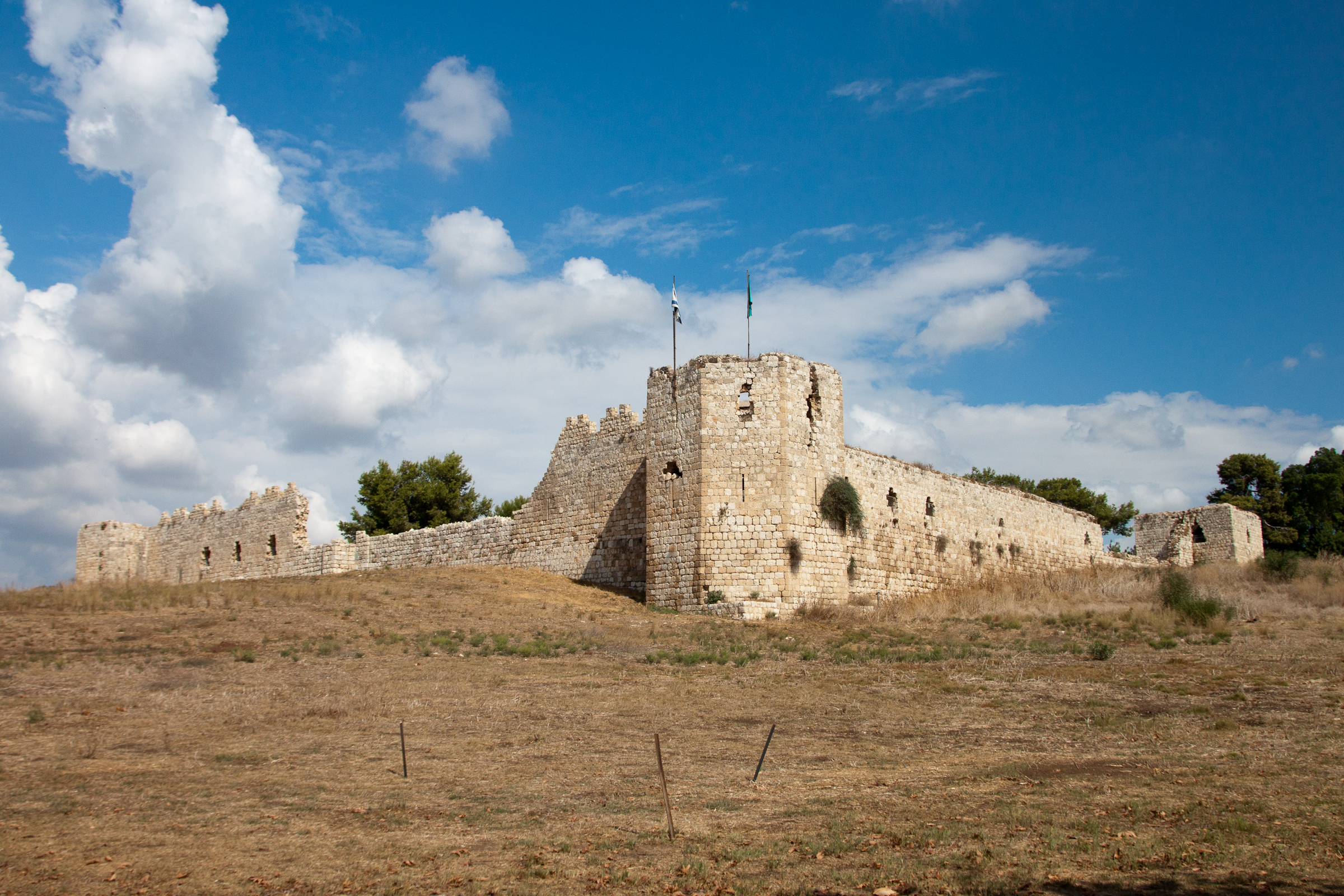
Binar Bashi, the Ottoman fortress at the head of the Yarkon River

Ottoman records indicate that a Mamluk fortress may have stood on the site. However, the Ottoman fortress was built following the publication of a firman in AD 1573 (981 H.):

"You have sent a letter and have reported that four walls of the fortress Ras al-Ayn have been built, [..] I have commanded that when [this firman] arrives you shall [..have built] the above mentioned rooms and mosque with its minaret and have the guards remove the earth outside and clean and tidy [the place].

The Turkish name of the place and fortress, pınar başı, means "fountain-head" or simply "head of the springs", much like the Arabic and Hebrew names (Ras al-Ayin and Rosh ha-Ayin, "head of the springs"). Pronounced by Arabic-speakers, it became "Binar Bashi" (Arabic has no "p").

The fortress was built to protect a vulnerable stretch of the Cairo-Damascus highway (the Via Maris), and was provided with 100 horsemen and 30 foot soldiers. The fortress was also supposed to supply soldiers to protect the hajj route. The fortress is a massive rectangular enclosure with four corner towers and a gate at the centre of the west side. The south-west tower is octagonal, while the three other towers have a square ground plan.

It appeared named Chateau de Ras el Ain on the map that Pierre Jacotin compiled in 1799.

The Arab peasants deserted the village in the 1920s.

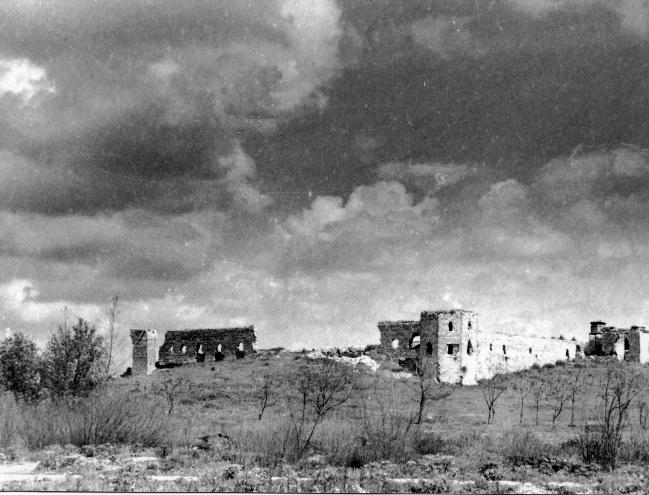
Antipatris fort. 1948

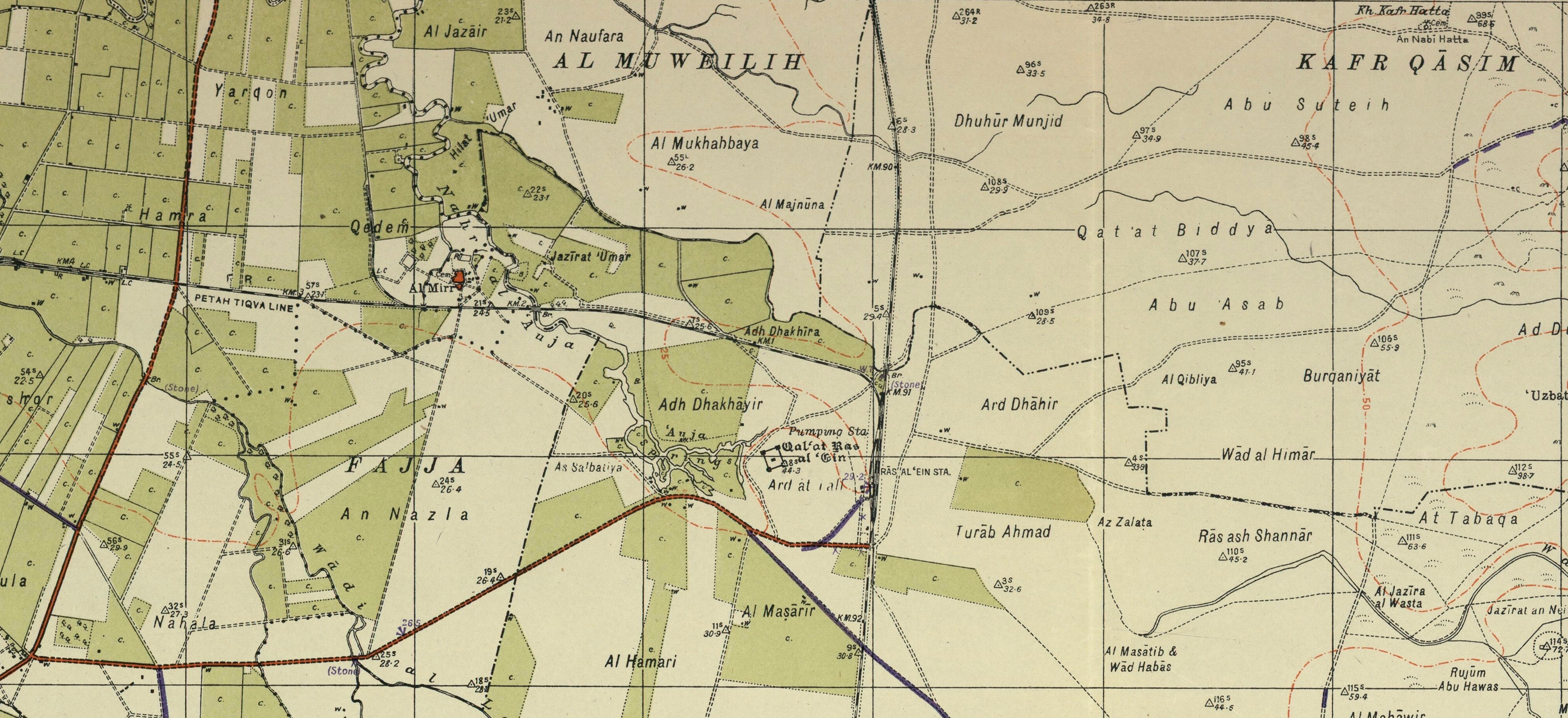
Ras al Ein 1941 1:20,000

=== Yarkon-Tel Afek national park ===
Currently, the site of Antipatris is included in the national park "Yarkon-Tel Afek", under the jurisdiction of the Israel Nature and Parks Authority, incorporating the area of the Ottoman fortress, the remains of the Roman city and the British water pumping station.

== Excavation ==
=== Area A ===
The earliest winepresses discovered to date in the Southern Levant were excavated adjoining the governor's residency at Tel Aphek, dated to the 13th century BC, the reign of Ramesses II. The two winepresses were plastered and possessed two treading floors (Hebrew: gat elyonah, “upper vat”) in parallel configuration extending over 6 m². Beneath and next to these, the stone-lined plastered collection vats (Hebrew: gat tahtonah, “lower vat”) could each store over 3 m³, or 3,000 litres, of pressed grape juice. Canaanite amphorae were recovered still in situ at the bottom of each pit, while a midden of grape skins, seeds and other debris was discovered adjacent to the installations [Kochavi 1981:81]. The excavator has drawn attention to the proximity of these winepresses to the Residency, their large size and the fact that ancient winepresses were normally located outside settlements amongst the vineyards suggesting that the Egyptian administration supervised the viniculturists of the Sharon closely [Kochavi 1990:XXIII].

=== Trade links and relations ===
It is clear that Tel Aphek was a site not only at the centre of imperial administration, but also well-connected to the international trade in luxury goods, as reflected in the abundant finds of Cypriot and Mycenaean ceramics.

Illustrative of Cypro-Canaanite trade especially is a fragmentary amphora handle [Aphek 5/29277], clearly inscribed after firing with Sign 38 of the Cypro-Minoan Linear Script [Yasur-Landau and Goren 2004]. The handle was excavated from secondary deposition in Aphek Area X, Locus 2953, belonging to the very meagre Stratum X11 built over the Governor's Residency. An extreme likelihood exists, therefore, that the object belonged to the earlier, more prosperous Stratum XI2 of the Residency itself. Given the as-yet-undeciphered nature of the script, the precise significance of the post-firing addition of a Cypro-Minoan sign must remain uncertain. At minimum the sign indicates that individuals employing Cypro-Minoan script handled the vessel from which the handle derived. Combined with petrographic analysis of the clay employed in manufacturing the amphora—pointing to an origin in or within the vicinity of Akko—the readiest reconstruction from the evidence must be that the vessel (and any companions) was manufactured in the Akko region before shipping, either to such redistribution points as Tell Abu Hawam or Tel Nami, or (more likely) to Cyprus itself (perhaps via one of these ports), where it was likely emptied of its original contents—certainly marked—before being shipped back to the Levant (now probably containing Cypriot product) and achieving final deposition at Aphek.

== National Park ==
Today, Tel Afek is situated within the Yarkon and Tel Afek National Park, which covers approximately 3,200 dunams (800 acres). The park serves as a major recreational area in central Israel, combining archaeological heritage with nature conservation.

The site features a large artificial lake created to help preserve local flora and fauna, particularly the Nuphar lutea, an endangered species in the region. A popular attraction is the "shichshuchit" (wading pools) system — a series of shallow water channels designed for visitors.

The Ottoman-era fortress, often referred to as the Antipatris Fortress or Binar Bashi is the park’s prominent landmark and offers panoramic views of the surrounding Gush Dan region. The park includes fortress ruins as well as nearby Roman-era remains, including a reconstructed Cardo and a small theater. The park also serves as a sanctuary for the Acanthobrama telavivensis, a rare fish species that was successfully reintroduced into the area’s restored freshwater habitats.

== See also ==
- Archaeology of Israel
- Barid, Muslim postal network strengthened in Palestine during the Mamluk period (roads, bridges, khans)
- Majdal Yaba east of Antipatris
- Tourism in Israel
- Water supply and sanitation in Israel

== Bibliography ==
- Abu Raya, Rafeh; Porat, Leea (2012-09-19). "Tel Afeq (Northeast)". 124. Hadashot Arkheologiyot – Excavations and Surveys in Israel.
- Beck, Pirhya and Kochavi, M. (1985), A Dated Assemblage of the Late 13th Century BCE from the Egyptian Residency at Aphek, in: Tel Aviv 12 (1985), pp. 29–42.
- Conder, C.R.; Kitchener, H.H. (1882). The Survey of Western Palestine: Memoirs of the Topography, Orography, Hydrography, and Archaeology. Vol. 2. London: Committee of the Palestine Exploration Fund. (pp. 266-267)
- Gadot, Yuval (2003), Continuity and Change: Cultural Processes in the Late Bronze and Early Iron Ages in Israel's Central Coastal Plain, unpublished PhD Dissertation, Tel Aviv University, 2003. (Hebrew with English summary)
- Gadot, Yuval (2006), Aphek in the Sharon and the Philistine Northern Frontier, in: BASOR 341 (2006), pp. 21–36.
- Golan, Dor (2008-09-11). "Tel Afeq". 120. Hadashot Arkheologiyot – Excavations and Surveys in Israel.
- Goren, Yuval; Naʾaman, Nadav; Mommsen, Hans and Finkelstein, I. (2006), Provenance Study and Re-evaluation of the Cuneiform Documents from the Egyptian Residency at Tel Aphek, in: Ä&L 16 (2006), pp. 161–171.
- Gil, M. (1997). A History of Palestine, 634 – 1099. University of Cambridge Press. ISBN 978-0-521-59984-9.
- Heyd, Uriel (1960), Ottoman Documents on Palestine, 1552-1615, Oxford University Press, Oxford. Cited in Petersen (2002)
- Itach, Gilad (2017-04-02). "Tel Afeq". 129. Hadashot Arkheologiyot – Excavations and Surveys in Israel.
- Karmon, Y. (1960). "An Analysis of Jacotin's Map of Palestine" (PDF). Israel Exploration Journal. 10 (3): 155–173, 244–253. Archived from the original (PDF) on 2019-12-22.
- Khalidi, W. (1992). All That Remains: The Palestinian Villages Occupied and Depopulated by Israel in 1948. Washington D.C.: Institute for Palestine Studies. ISBN 978-0-88728-224-9.
- Kochavi, M. (1981), The History and Archaeology of Aphek-Antipatris, in: The Biblical Archaeologist 44 (1981), pp. 75–86.
- Kochavi, M. (1990), Aphek in Canaan: The Egyptian Governor's Residence and Its Finds, Catalogue 312, Jerusalem: Israel Museum, 1990.
- Kochavi, M. and Beit Arieh, I. (1994), Map of Rosh Ha-ʿAyin, Jerusalem: Israel Antiquities Authority, 1994.
- Kochavi, M. (1997). "Aphek". The Oxford Encyclopedia of Archaeology in the Near East. ISBN 978-0195112153.
- Le Strange, G. (1890). Palestine Under the Moslems: A Description of Syria and the Holy Land from A.D. 650 to 1500. Committee of the Palestine Exploration Fund. (p.472) Also Cited in Petersen (2002)
- Mahler-Slasky, Y. and Kislev, M. E. (in press), Food Remains from Area X, in: Kochavi, Moshe, Gadot, Yuval and Yadin, Esther (eds.), Aphek II: The Remains of the Acropolis, Tel Aviv: Institute of Archaeology (Monograph Series of the Institute of Archaeology, Tel Aviv University, vol. 27), Tel Aviv University, 2009, pp.?-?.
- Palmer, E.H. (1881). The Survey of Western Palestine: Arabic and English Name Lists Collected During the Survey by Lieutenants Conder and Kitchener, R. E. Transliterated and Explained by E.H. Palmer. Committee of the Palestine Exploration Fund.
- Petersen, Andrew (2001). A Gazetteer of Buildings in Muslim Palestine (British Academy Monographs in Archaeology). Vol. I. Oxford University Press. pp. 255–57. ISBN 978-0-19-727011-0.
- Porat, Leea (2010-12-26). "Tel Afeq (East)". 122. Hadashot Arkheologiyot – Excavations and Surveys in Israel.
- Shadman, Amit. The Rural Hinterland of Antipatris from the Hellenistic to the Byzantine Periods. Archaeopress. ISBN 9781803275277.
- Le Strange, G. (1890). Palestine Under the Moslems: A Description of Syria and the Holy Land from A.D. 650 to 1500. London: Committee of the Palestine Exploration Fund.
- Yasur-Landau, Assaf and Goren, Yuval (2004), A Cypro-Minoan Potmark from Aphek, TA 31.1 (2004), pp. 22–31.
