= Shemuel Yeivin =

Israeli archaeologist (1896–1982)

- שמואל ייבין
- Born: 2 September 1896; Odessa, Kherson Governorate, Russian Empire
- Died: 28 February 1982 (aged 85); Tel Aviv, Israel
- Education: University College London
- Occupation: Archaeologist
- Known for: First director of the Israel Antiquities Authority
- Awards: Bialik Prize (1955); Israel Prize (1968)

Shemuel Yeivin (Hebrew: שמואל ייבין; September 2, 1896 – February 28, 1982), also spelled Shmuel, was an Israeli archaeologist and the first director of the Israel Antiquities Authority.

== Early life and education ==
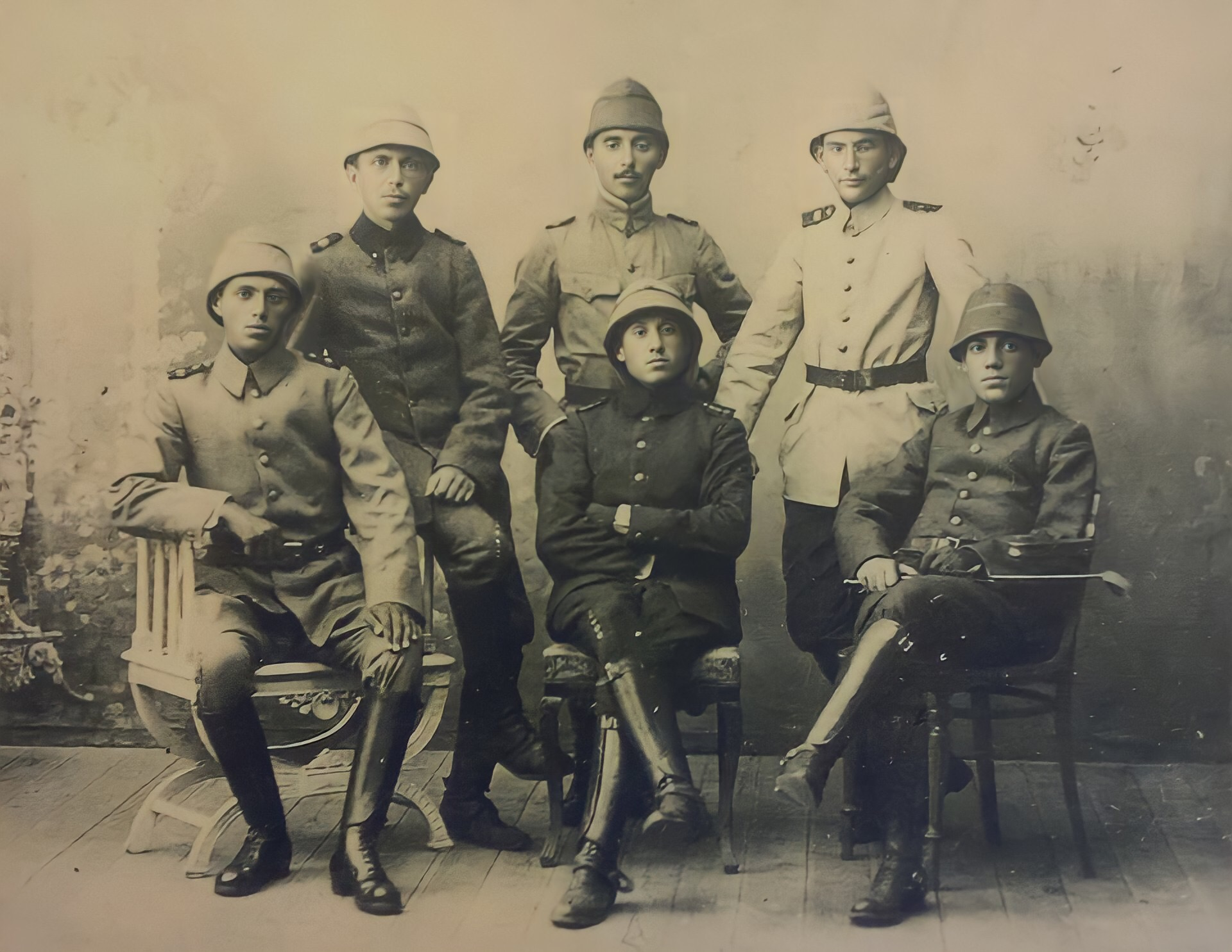
Graduates of Herzliya Gymnasium as officers in the Ottoman Army in Constantinople, 1916. Standing: Dov Hoz, Moshe Sharett, and Yeivin. Seated: David Beit Halachmi, Avshalom Gissin, and Moshe Gvirtzman.

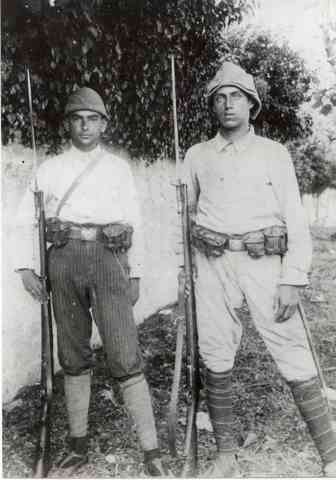
Yeivin and David Beit Halachmi, 1916

Shemuel Yeivin was born in Odessa, in the Jewish Pale of Settlement of the Russian Empire, on 2 September 1896. His father was Nissan Yeivin, a descendant of Rabbi Yaakov Yosef ben Yehuda, from whom the family derived their surname. His mother, Esther Yeivin, went on to become a noted women's rights activist and member of the Jewish National Council and Assembly of Representatives. Following the 1905 Odessa pogrom, Esther and her children joined the Second Aliyah and emigrated to Palestine, then part of the Ottoman Empire. Their father joined them in 1908, purchasing a farm in Gedera. The family later moved to Tel Aviv, where Shemuel studied at the Herzliya Hebrew Gymnasium.

After graduating from Herzliya in 1914, Yeivin was drafted into the Ottoman Army to fight in the First World War, serving as an officer until the end of the war in 1918.

He earned academic degrees in Egyptology and Semitic philology and studied archaeology under Sir Flinders Petrie at University College London.

== Archaeology career ==
In Mandatory Palestine, Yeiven was an active member of the Jewish Palestine Exploration Society, serving as its chair between 1944 and 1946. Speaking at a meeting of the society in Tel Aviv in 1934, he celebrated archaeologists' "discovery of Hebrew Palestine" in excavations at Tell Beit Mirsim, Tel Megiddo, and Tel Lachish in the previous decade. Later he participated in the first yedi'at ha-Aretz ("Knowledge of the Land") conference, organised by the society in Jerusalem in 1943, arguing for the expansion of regional museums to educate Jewish settlers about the antiquities of the country. He also took part in excavations at Luxor (1924), Beit Shean (1924–28), Seleucia (1929–37) and was the co-director, with J. Krause-Marquet, of excavations at Ai in 1933.

After the establishment of the State of Israel in 1948, Yeivin was appointed the inaugural director of its Department of Antiquities and Museums, which succeeded the Department of Antiquities of Mandatory Palestine and is now known as the Israel Antiquities Authority. He held the position until 1961. In 1962 he established the Department of Ancient Near Eastern Studies at Tel Aviv University (later the Tel Aviv University Institute of Archaeology) in 1962. He was succeeded by Yohanan Aharoni in 1968.

He received the Bialik Prize for Jewish Thought in 1955 and the Israel Prize in 1968.

== Selected publications ==
- 1939, Toledot ha-Ketav ha-Ivri (The History of the Hebrew Script)
- 1946, Milḥamot Bar Kokhva (The War of Bar-Kochba)
- 1955, Kadmoniyyot Arẓenu (The Antiquities of Israel), co-authored with Michael Avi-Yonah
