= Oded Lipschits =

Israeli archaeologist

- עודד ליפשיץ
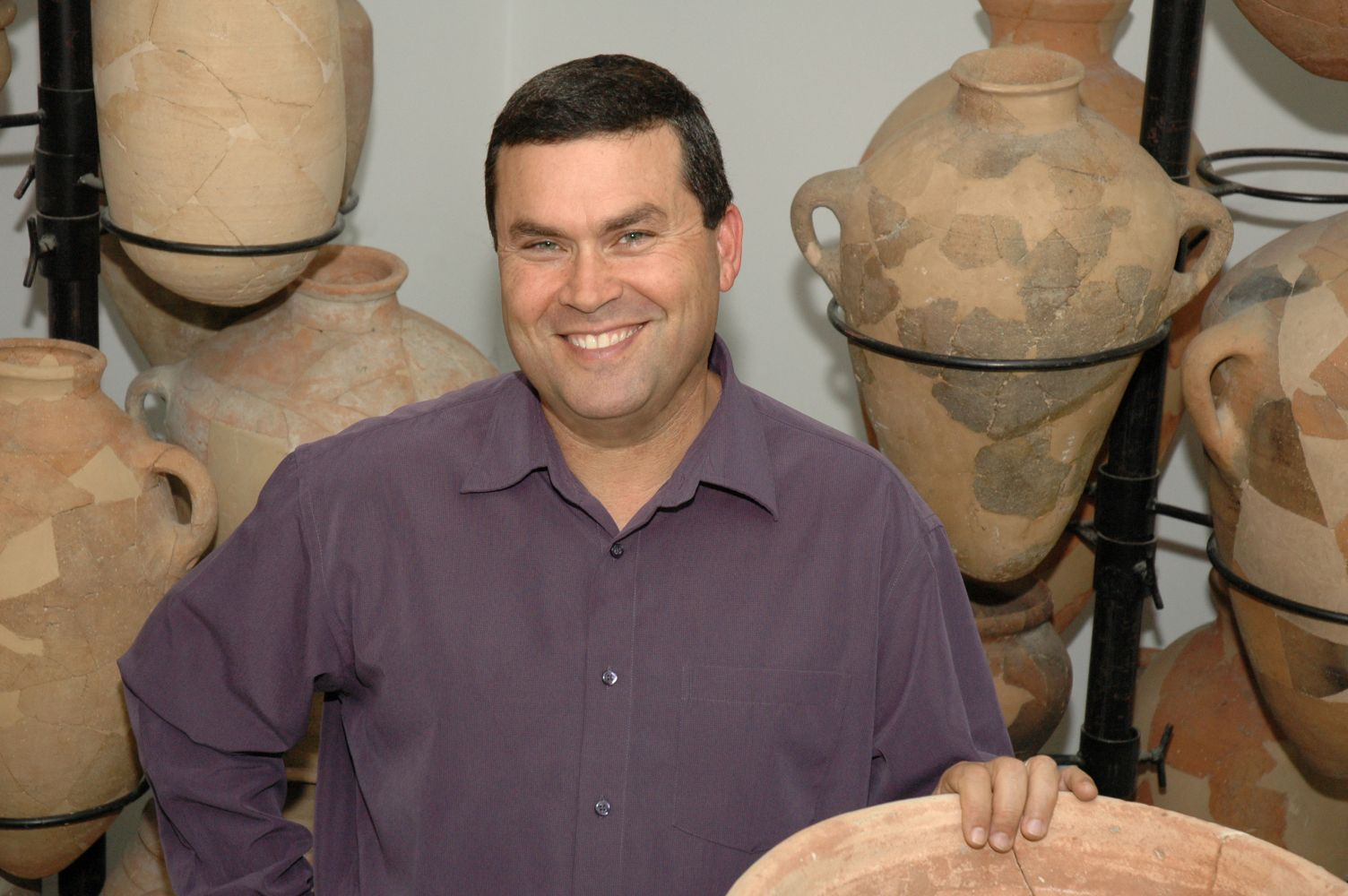
- Born: 1963 (age 62–63); Jerusalem, Israel
- Spouse: Yael (Moreno) Lipschits
- Awards: EMET Prize (2021); Emet Prize (2022)

Academic work
- Discipline: Jewish History, Archaeology
- Main interests: Judah and the Southern Levant in the 1st millennium

Oded Lipschits (Hebrew: עודד ליפשיץ; born May 15, 1963) is an Israeli professor in the Department of Archaeology and Ancient Near East Studies at Tel Aviv University. In 1997 he earned his Ph.D. in Jewish History under the supervision of Nadav Na'aman. He has since become a Senior Lecturer and Full Professor at Tel Aviv University and served as the Director of the Tel Aviv Institute of Archaeology since 2011. Lipschits is an incumbent of the Austria Chair of the Archeology of the Land of Israel in the Biblical Period and is the Head and founder of the Ancient Israel Studies Masters program in the Department of Archaeology and Ancient Near East Studies.

Most of Lipschits' research relates to the history, archaeology, and biblical account of the Southern Levant, specifically narratives related to the development of Judah within its local and regional setting, as well its transformation under imperial control i.e., Assyria, Babylon, Persia, Macedonia. Together with his colleagues, Lipschits has directed several archaeological excavations including Ramat Rachel (2004–2010), Tel Azekah (2012–) and Tel Moza (2018–). Oded Lipschits is credited with authoring and co-authoring over a dozen books and several hundred articles. He has organized and lectured in over 200 local and international conferences worldwide and has been the recipient of several prestigious awards, grants, and scholarships, including the EMET Prize in the field of Archaeology (2022).

== Biography ==
Oded Lipschits was born in Jerusalem in 1963, and served in the IDF between 1981 and 1985 (in the military reserve until 2008) and ultimately discharged with the rank of major. Lipschits is married to Yael (Moreno) Lipschits and lives in Alon HaGalil. They have four children.

=== Academic career ===
Lipschits began his studies in archaeology and Jewish history at the Tel Aviv University in 1985, and received his Ph.D. in 1997 from the Department of Jewish history, Tel Aviv University. The subject of his doctoral dissertation was “The ‘Yehud’ Province under Babylonian Rule (586-539 B.C.E.): Historic Reality and Historiographic Conceptions”, which he wrote under the supervision of Nadav Na'aman. After graduating, Lipschits received the Alexander von Humboldt Research Fellowship for outstanding post-Doctoral researchers and in 2002–2003 completed his post-doctorate in the Faculty of Theology at Heidelberg University.

In 1998 Lipschits became a faculty member and in 2002 he received the title of Senior Lecturer with tenure from the Department of Jewish History, Tel Aviv University. In 2007 he became Associate Professor, and in 2012 was appointed a Full Professorship at the Tel Aviv University. Lipschits has established and has since headed the MA program in Ancient Israel Studies and International MA program for the History and Archaeology of the Holy Land. He has served since 2011 as the director of the Tel Aviv University Institute of Archaeology. Lipschits has supervised more than 50 MA students and 20 Ph.D., students.

== Research ==
The primary focus of Lipschits' research is the Southern Levant, and the land of Judah in the Iron Age, Persian, Hellenistic and Hasmonean periods.

=== Judah under Babylonian rule ===
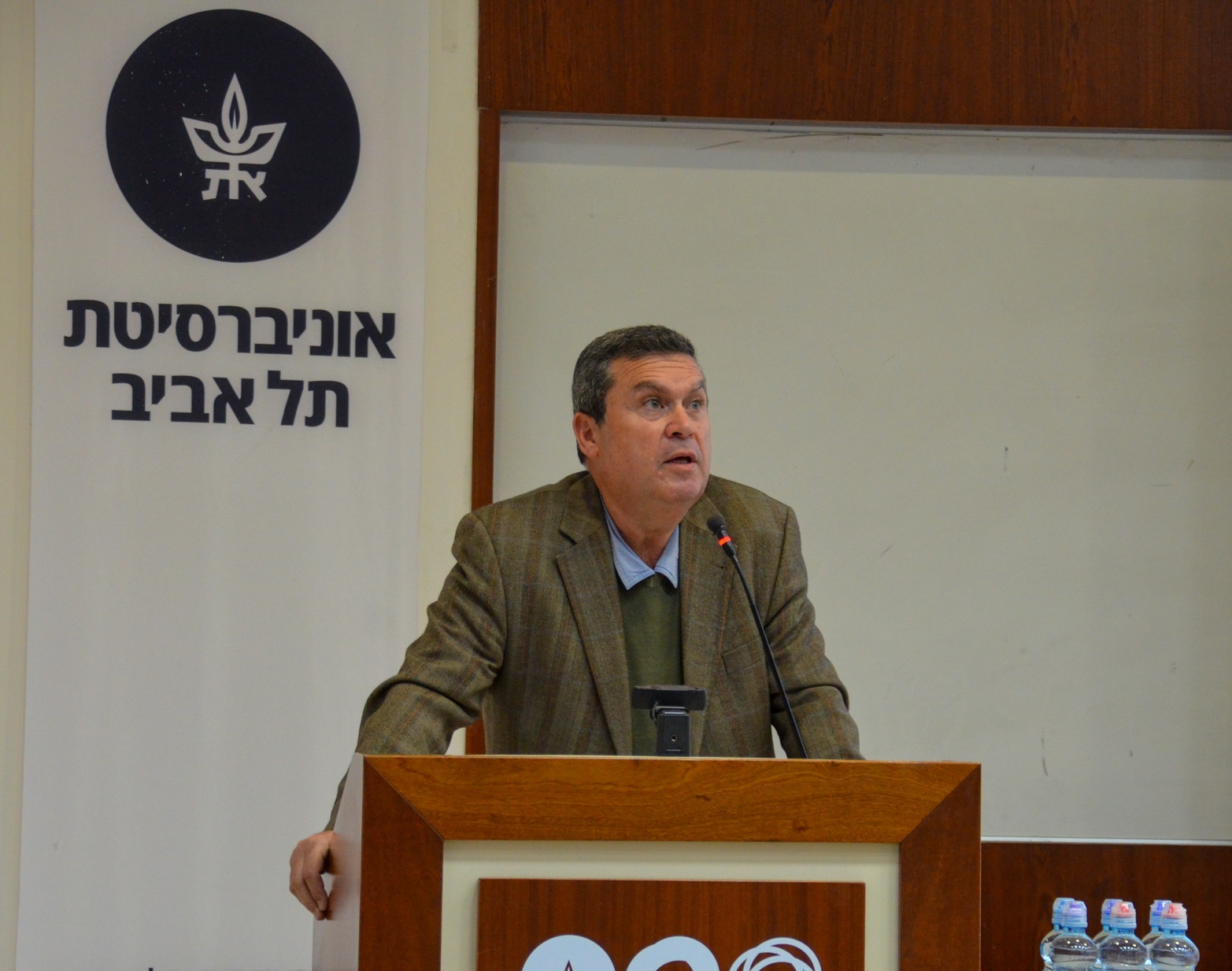
Lipschits, 2022

Through his application of Biblical criticism, critical studies of historical sources and archaeological data, Lipschits has maintained that contrary to the conservative interpretation of the Biblical narrative, the country during this period was shaped by the presence of foreign empires, starting in the 8th century BCE with the Neo-Assyrian Empire. This stands in contrast to the understanding of Jewish history as divided into First and Second Temple periods, with a settlement and cultural "gap" in the mid-6th century, explained by the Biblical narrative of the Babylonian exile. Lipschits has demonstrated in his book The Fall and Rise of Jerusalem: Judah Under Babylonian Rule (2004) that significant parts of Judah remained inhabited during the Babylonian rule. This work which is based on his doctoral dissertation has granted him the Ish-Shalom Prize for the Best 'First-Fruit' Book in the Research of the History of Israel. Although his revolutionary thesis was not accepted by all scholars, his critics have praised the book for its extent, organization and detail, citing it as one of the most comprehensive works on the subject to date, that is important and worthy of study.

=== Ramat Rachel excavations ===
From 2004 to 2010 Oded Lipschits has co-directed the excavations at Ramat Rachel with Manfred Oeming of the Heidelberg University. The expedition unearthed a royal palace and garden, that existed south of Jerusalem from the 7th–2nd centuries BCE. The excavation has provided essential archaeological data on the 6th and 5th century BCE. Lipschits has demonstrated in a series of articles that during the Persian rule the administrative and economic center of the Judean province has shifted from Tell en-Nasbeh north of Jerusalem, to Ramat Rachel, and not to Jerusalem as previously thought.

=== Stamp seals in Judah ===
Together with David S. Vanderhooft of Boston University, Lipschits has pioneered a comprehensive study of the Judean stamp seals during the Persian rule with consideration to their use as a chronological marker and their importance in illuminating the economy of Judah in that period. This project was summarized in the book The Yehud Stamp Impressions: A Corpus of Inscribed Impressions from the Persian and Hellenistic Periods in Judah, which granted the authors the G. Ernest Wright Award of the American Schools of Oriental Research for the most substantial volume dealing with material culture from the Ancient Near East (2012). Lipschits then continued the study with his colleagues, expanding the framework to the first appearance of stamp seals in Judah, such as the LMLK seals and published a book titled Age of Empire: The History and Administration of Judah in the 8th-2nd Centuries BCE in Light of Storage-Jar Stamp Impressions.

=== Tel Azekah excavations ===
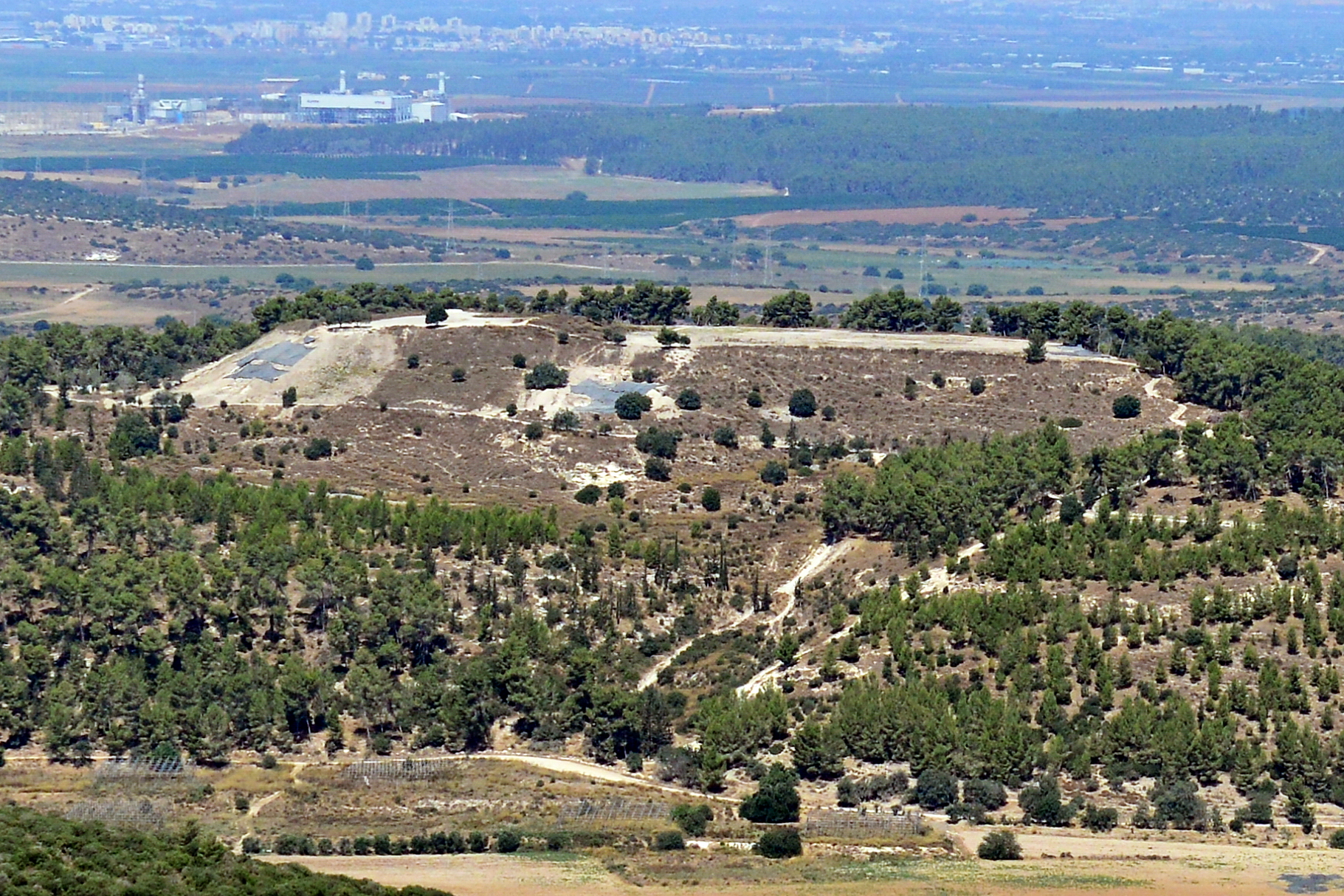
Tel Azekah, excavated by Lipschits and his colleagues since 2010

Since 2010, Lipschits is co-directing the Lautenschläger Azekah Expedition together with Yuval Gadot and Manfred Oeming. Tel Azekah is located in the Shfela and understood as multi-period site with occupational levels that span the Early Bronze Age to the Roman period. The site has revealed monumental remains from the Middle Bronze Age, key desctruction contexts from the Late Bronze Age III, and shed light on the presence and history of the Kingdom of Judah in the region.

=== Tel Moza excavations ===
Since 2018, Lipschits has co-directed the Tel Moza Expedition Project with Shua Kisilevitz. Tel Moza is a key site located a walking distance from Jerusalem. The focus of the project is a temple complex dated to the Iron Age IIA period (10th-9th centuries BCE), which existed parallel to Jerusalem.

== Selected publications ==
=== Authored books ===
- Lipschits, Oded (2005). The Fall and Rise of Jerusalem: Judah Under Babylonian Rule. Winona Lake, Ind.: Eisenbrauns. ISBN 1575060957. (translation of the original Hebrew publication, 2004)
- Lipschits, Oded; Vanderhooft, David S. (2011). The Yehud Stamp Impressions: A Corpus of Inscribed Impressions from the Persian and Hellenistic Periods in Judah. Winona Lake, Ind.: Eisenbrauns. ISBN 978-1575061832.
- Lipschits, Oded; Gadot, Yuval; Arubas, Benny; Oeming, Manfred (2017). What are the Stones Whispering?: Ramat Rahel : 3000 Years of Forgotten History. Winona Lake, Indiana. ISBN 978-1-57506-498-7. (translation of the original Hebrew publication, 2014)
- Lipschits, Oded; Gadot, Yuval; Freud, Liora; Aharoni, Yohanan (2016). Ramat-Raḥel III: Final Publication of Yohanan Aharoni's Excavations (1954, 1959-1962). Winona Lake, Indiana. ISBN 978-1575064901.
- Lipschits, Oded (2021). Age of Empires: The History and Administration of Judah in the 8th–2nd Centuries BCE in Light of the Storage-Jar Stamp Impressions (Mosaics: Studies on Ancient Israel). University Park, Pennsylvania. ISBN 978-1646021604. (translation of the original Hebrew publication, 2018)
- Lipschits, Oded; Oeming, Manfred; Godot, Yuval (2020). Ramat Raḥel IV: The Renewed Excavations by the Tel Aviv–Heidelberg Expedition (2005–2010): Stratigraphy and Architecture (Monograph Series of the Sonia and Marco Nadler Institute of Archaeology). University Park, Pennsylvania. ISBN 978-1646020782.
- Lipschits, Oded; Freud, Liora; Oeming, Manfred; Gadot, Yuval (2021). Ramat Raḥel VI: The Renewed Excavations by the Tel Aviv–Heidelberg Expedition (2005–2010). The Babylonian-Persian Pit. University Park, Pennsylvania: Eisenbrauns. ISBN 978-1-64602-113-0.

=== Edited books ===
- Lipschits, Oded; Blenkinsopp, Joseph, eds. (2003). Judah and the Judeans in the Neo-Babylonian Period. Winona-Lake. ISBN 9781575065403.
- Lipschits, Oded; Oeming, Manfred, eds. (2006). Judah and the Judeans in the Persian Period. Winona-Lake: Eisenbrauns. ISBN 9781575061047.
- Amit, Yaira; Ben Zvi, Ehud; Finkelstein, Israel; Lipschits, Oded, eds. (2006). Essays on Ancient Israel in Its Near Eastern Context: A Tribute to Nadav Naʼaman. Winona Lake. ISBN 9781575061283.
- Lipschits, Oded; Knoppers, Gary N.; Albertz, Rainer, eds. (2007). Judah and the Judeans in the Fourth Century B.C.E. Winona-Lake: Eisenbrauns. ISBN 9781575061306.
- Lipschits, Oded; Grabbe, Lester L., eds. (2011). Judah Between East and West:The Transition from Persian to Greek Rule (ca. 400-200 BCE). T&T Clark. ISBN 9780567046840.
- Lipschits, Oded; Knoppers, Gary N.; Oeming, Manfred, eds. (2011). Judah and the Judeans in the Achaemenid Period: Negotiating Identity in an International Context. Winona-Lake. ISBN 978-1575061979.
- Lipschits, Oded; Maeir, Aren M., eds. (2017). The Shephelah during the Iron Age Recent Archaeological Studies. Winona-Lake: Eisenbrauns. ISBN 9781575064864.
- Lipschits, Oded; Gadot, Yuval; Adams, Matthew J., eds. (2017). Rethinking Israel: Studies in the History and Archaeology of Ancient Israel in Honor of Israel Finkelstein. Winona Lake: Eisenbrauns. ISBN 978-1575067872.
- Čapek, Filip; Lipschits, Oded, eds. (2019). The Last Century in the History of Judah: The Seventh Century BCE in Archaeological, Historical, and Biblical Perspectives (Ancient Israel and Its Literature). Atlanta: SBL. ISBN 978-0884143994.
- Honigman, Sylvie; Nihan, Christophe; Lipschits, Oded, eds. (2021). Times of Transition: Judea in the Early Hellenistic Period. Tel Aviv and University Park PA. ISBN 978-1-64602-114-7.

== See also ==
- Israel Finkelstein
- David Ussishkin
- Aren Maeir
- Matthew J. Adams
- Yosef Garfinkel
