= Porotic hyperostosis =

- Other names: Osteoporosis symmetrica, Cribra crani, Hyperostosis spongiosa, and Symmetrical osteoporosis

Porotic hyperostosis, is a pathological condition that affects bones of the cranial vault, and is characterized by localized areas of spongy or porous bone tissue. The diploë, or spongy tissue within the bones of the cranium, swells and the tissue of the outer surface becomes thinner and more porous in appearance.

This condition was widely accepted as a result of anemia, which is typically due to an iron deficient diet, but several lines of evidence suggest that the accelerated loss and compensatory over-production of red blood cells seen in hemolytic and megaloblastic anemia are the most likely proximate causes of porotic hyperostosis.

In anthropology, the presence of the condition has been considered evidence that a past population suffered chronic or episodic malnutrition. Anthropologists examine bones of past populations to learn about their lifestyles. A sub-discipline known as paleonutrition has focused on the presence of porotic hyperostosis, among other nutritional disorders. A high incidence of the disease indicates the population adapted poorly to its environment or was under nutritional stress. A low level of iron in the blood is also a defense against pathogens, so a high incidence of the disease in a population could also indicate an attempt to fight off an infectious disease. From this perspective, porotic hyperostosis could be viewed as a biological attempt to adapt to the environment, rather than an indicator of malnutrition.
