= Parasitism =

Type of interaction between species

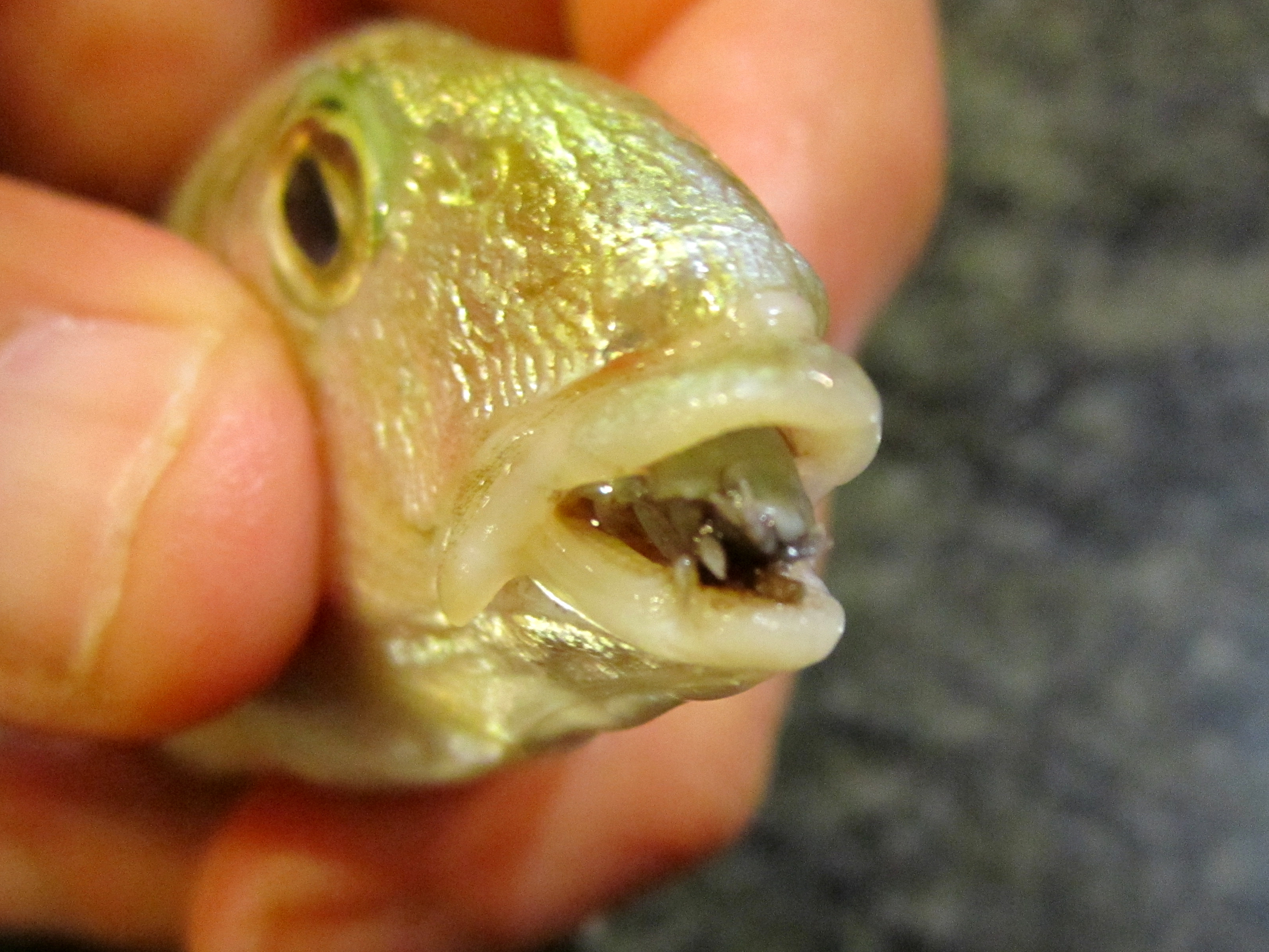
A fish parasite, the isopod Cymothoa exigua, replacing the tongue of a Lithognathus

Parasitism is a close relationship between species, where one organism, the parasite, lives (at least some of the time) on or inside another organism, the host, causing it some harm, and is adapted structurally to this way of life. Parasites include single-celled protozoans such as the agents of malaria, sleeping sickness, and amoebic dysentery; animals such as hookworms, lice, mosquitoes, and vampire bats; fungi such as honey fungus and the agents of ringworm; and plants such as mistletoe, dodder, and the broomrapes.

There are six major parasitic strategies of exploitation of animal hosts, namely parasitic castration, directly transmitted parasitism (by contact), trophically-transmitted parasitism (by being eaten), vector-transmitted parasitism, parasitoidism, and micropredation. One major axis of classification concerns invasiveness: an endoparasite lives inside the host's body; an ectoparasite lives outside, on the host's surface.

Like predation, parasitism is a type of consumer–resource interaction, but unlike predators, parasites, with the exception of parasitoids, are much smaller than their hosts, do not kill them, and often live in or on their hosts for an extended period. Parasites of animals are often highly specialised to live on one or a few species, and reproduce at a faster rate than their hosts. Classic examples include interactions between vertebrate hosts and tapeworms, flukes, and those between the malaria-causing Plasmodium species, and fleas.

Parasites reduce host fitness by general or specialised pathology, that ranges from parasitic castration to modification of host behaviour. Parasites increase their own fitness by exploiting hosts for resources necessary for their survival, in particular by feeding on them and by using intermediate (secondary) hosts to assist in their transmission from one definitive (primary) host to another. Although parasitism is often unambiguous, it is part of a spectrum of interactions between species, grading via parasitoidism into predation, through evolution into mutualism, and in some fungi, shading into being saprophytic.

Human knowledge of parasites such as roundworms and tapeworms dates back to ancient Egypt, Greece, and Rome. In early modern times, Antonie van Leeuwenhoek observed Giardia lamblia with his microscope in 1681, while Francesco Redi described internal and external parasites including sheep liver fluke and ticks. Modern parasitology developed in the 19th century. In human culture, parasitism has negative connotations. These were exploited to satirical effect in Jonathan Swift's 1733 poem "On Poetry: A Rhapsody", comparing poets to hyperparasitical "vermin". In fiction, Bram Stoker's 1897 Gothic horror novel Dracula and its many later adaptations featured a blood-drinking parasite. Ridley Scott's 1979 film Alien was one of many works of science fiction to feature a parasitic alien species.

== Etymology ==
First used in English in 1539, the word parasite comes from the Medieval French parasite, from the Latinised form parasitus, from Ancient Greek παράσιτος (parasitos) 'one who eats at the table of another', in turn from παρά (para) 'beside, by' and σῖτος (sitos) 'wheat, food'. The related term parasitism appears in English from 1611.

== Evolutionary strategies ==
=== Basic concepts ===
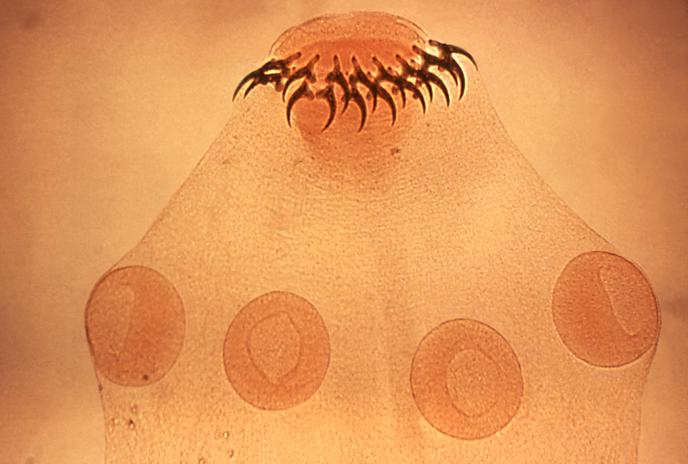
Head (scolex) of tapeworm Taenia solium, an intestinal parasite, has hooks and suckers to attach to its host

Parasitism is a kind of symbiosis, a close and persistent long-term biological interaction between a parasite and its host. Unlike saprotrophs, parasites feed on living hosts, though some parasitic fungi, for instance, may continue to feed on hosts they have killed. Unlike commensalism and mutualism, the parasitic relationship harms the host, either feeding on it or, as in the case of intestinal parasites, consuming some of its food. Because parasites interact with other species, they can readily act as vectors of pathogens, causing disease. Predation is by definition not a symbiosis, as the interaction is brief, but the entomologist E. O. Wilson has characterised parasites as "predators that eat prey in units of less than one".

Within that scope are many possible strategies. Taxonomists classify parasites in a variety of overlapping schemes, based on their interactions with their hosts and on their life cycles, which can be complex. An obligate parasite depends completely on the host to complete its life cycle, while a facultative parasite does not. Parasite life cycles involving only one host are called "direct"; those with a definitive host (where the parasite reproduces sexually) and at least one intermediate host are called "indirect". An endoparasite lives inside the host's body; an ectoparasite lives outside, on the host's surface. Mesoparasites—like some copepods, for example—enter an opening in the host's body and remain partly embedded there. Some parasites can be generalists, feeding on a wide range of hosts, but many parasites, and the majority of protozoans and helminths that parasitise animals, are specialists and extremely host-specific. An early basic, functional division of parasites distinguished microparasites and macroparasites. These each had a mathematical model assigned in order to analyse the population movements of the host–parasite groupings. The microorganisms and viruses that can reproduce and complete their life cycle within the host are known as microparasites. Macroparasites are the multicellular organisms that reproduce and complete their life cycle outside of the host or on the host's body.

Much of the thinking on types of parasitism has focused on terrestrial animal parasites of animals, such as helminths. Those in other environments and with other hosts often have analogous strategies. For example, the snubnosed eel is probably a facultative endoparasite (i.e., it is semiparasitic) that opportunistically burrows into and eats sick and dying fish. Plant-eating insects such as scale insects, aphids, and caterpillars closely resemble ectoparasites, attacking much larger plants; they serve as vectors of bacteria, fungi and viruses which cause plant diseases. As female scale insects cannot move, they are obligate parasites, permanently attached to their hosts.

The sensory inputs that a parasite employs to identify and approach a potential host are known as "host cues". Such cues can include, for example, vibration, exhaled carbon dioxide, skin odours, visual and heat signatures, and moisture. Parasitic plants can use, for example, light, host physiochemistry, and volatiles to recognize potential hosts.

=== Major strategies ===
There are six major parasitic strategies, namely parasitic castration; directly transmitted parasitism; trophically-transmitted parasitism; vector-transmitted parasitism; parasitoidism; and micropredation. These apply to parasites whose hosts are plants as well as animals. These strategies represent adaptive peaks; intermediate strategies are possible, but organisms in many different groups have consistently converged on these six, which are evolutionarily stable.

A perspective on the evolutionary options can be gained by considering four key questions: the effect on the fitness of a parasite's hosts; the number of hosts they have per life stage; whether the host is prevented from reproducing; and whether the effect depends on intensity (number of parasites per host). From this analysis, the major evolutionary strategies of parasitism emerge, alongside predation.

Evolutionary strategies in parasitism and predation (Intensity-dependent: green, roman; Intensity-independent: purple, italics)
Host fitness	Single host, stays alive	Single host, dies	Multiple hosts
Able to reproduce (fitness > 0)	Conventional parasite Pathogen	Trophically-transmitted parasite (Note: Trophically-transmitted parasites are transmitted to their definitive host, a predator, when their intermediate host is eaten. These parasites often modify the behaviour of their intermediate hosts, causing them to behave in a way that makes them likely to be eaten, such as by climbing to a conspicuous point: this gets the parasites transmitted at the cost of the intermediate host's life.); Trophically-transmitted pathogen	Micropredator; Micropredator
Unable to reproduce (fitness = 0)	----- Parasitic castrator	Trophically-transmitted parasitic castrator Parasitoid	Social predator (Note: The wolf is a social predator, hunting in packs; the cougar is a solitary predator, hunting alone. Neither strategy is conventionally considered parasitic.); Solitary predator

==== Parasitic castrators ====
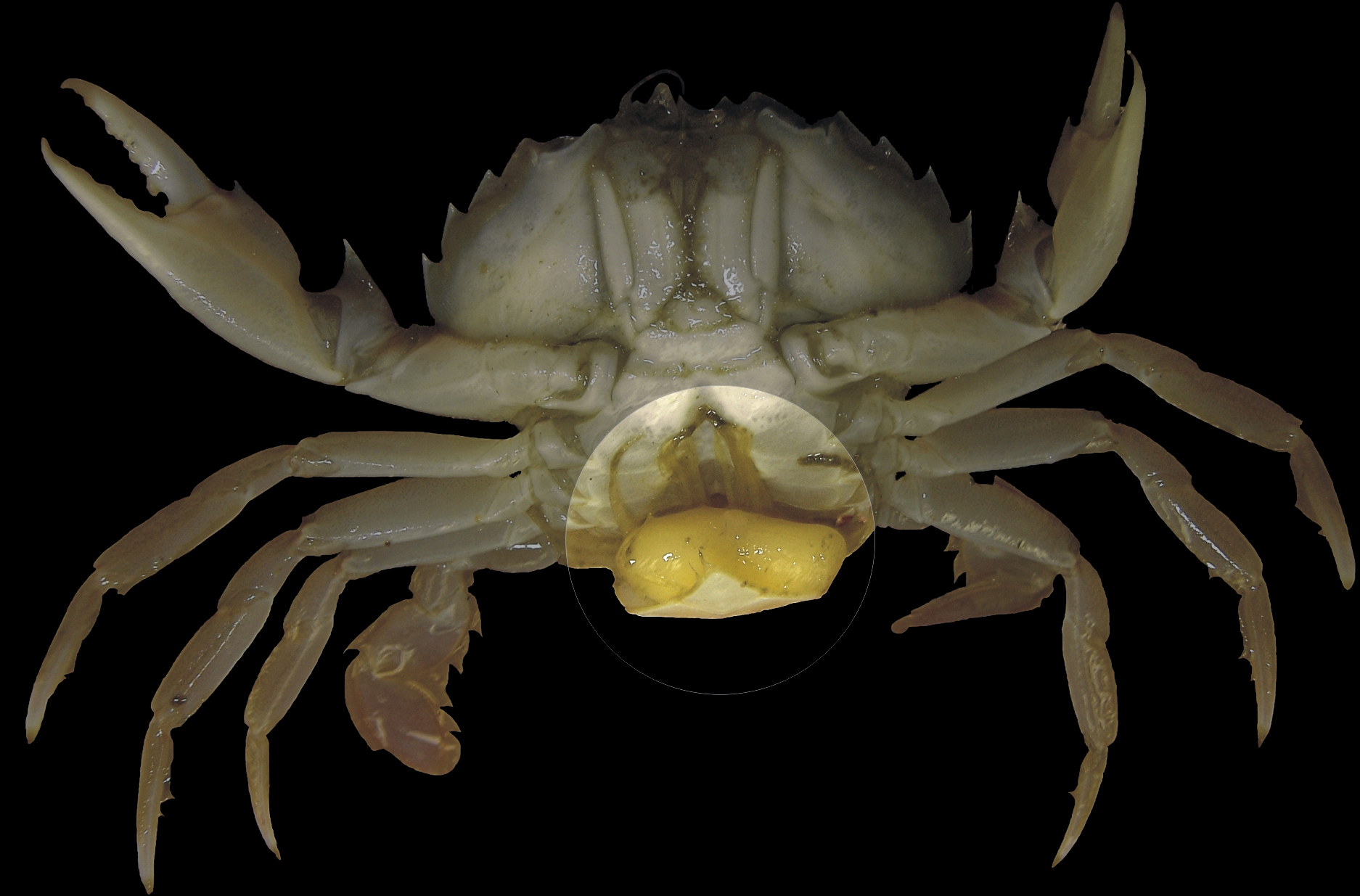
The parasitic castrator Sacculina carcini (highlighted) attached to its crab host

Parasitic castrators partly or completely destroy their host's ability to reproduce, diverting the energy that would have gone into reproduction into host and parasite growth, sometimes causing gigantism in the host. The host's other systems remain intact, allowing it to survive and to sustain the parasite. Parasitic crustaceans such as those in the specialised barnacle genus Sacculina specifically cause damage to the gonads of their many species of host crabs. In the case of Sacculina, the testes of over two-thirds of their crab hosts degenerate sufficiently for these male crabs to develop female secondary sex characteristics such as broader abdomens, smaller claws and egg-grasping appendages. Various species of helminth castrate their hosts (such as insects and snails). This may happen directly, whether mechanically by feeding on their gonads, or by secreting a chemical that destroys reproductive cells; or indirectly, whether by secreting a hormone or by diverting nutrients. For example, the trematode Zoogonus lasius, whose sporocysts lack mouths, castrates the intertidal marine snail Tritia obsoleta chemically, developing in its gonad and killing its reproductive cells.

==== Directly transmitted ====
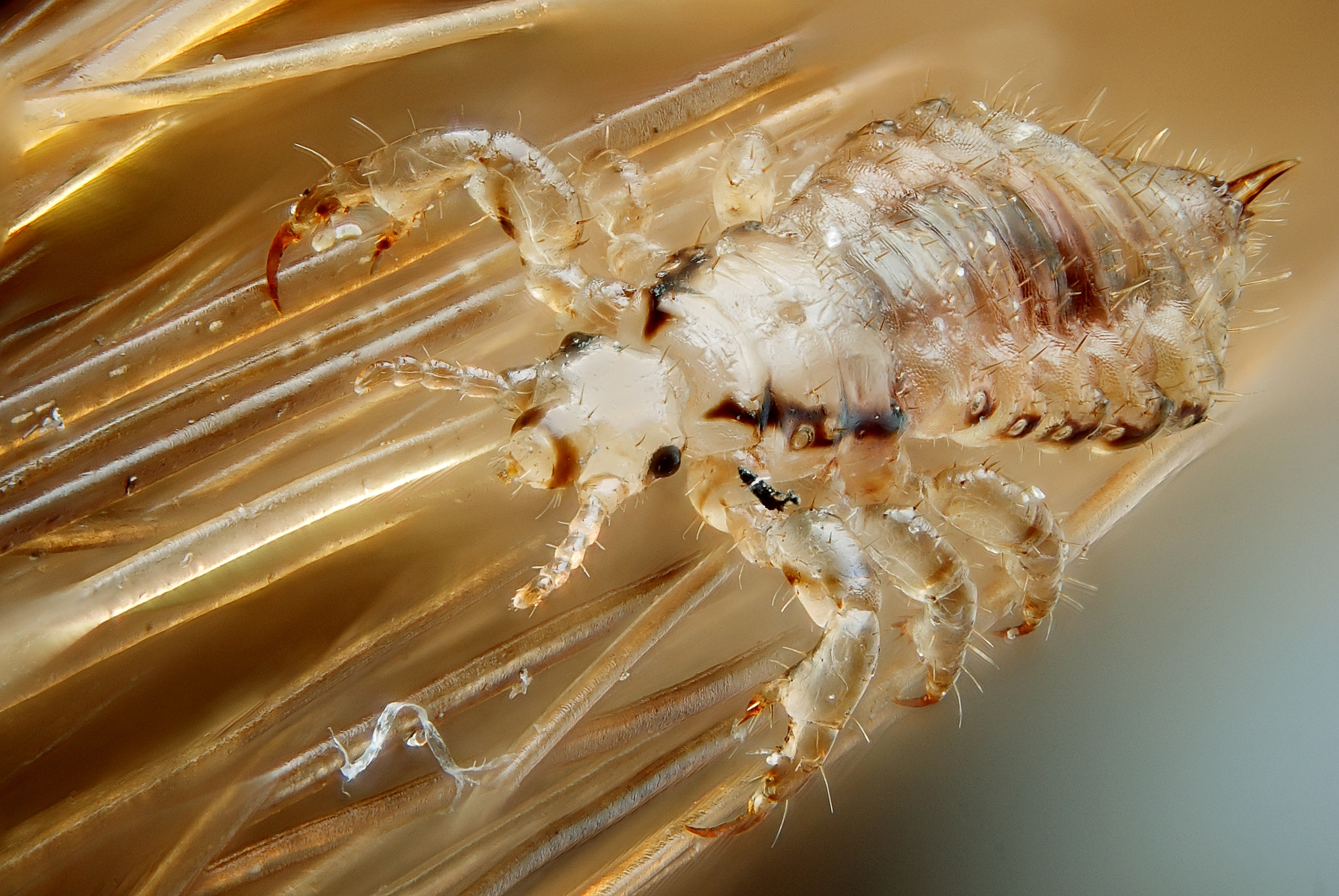
Human head-lice are directly transmitted obligate ectoparasites

Directly transmitted parasites, not requiring a vector to reach their hosts, include such parasites of terrestrial vertebrates as lice and mites; marine parasites such as copepods and cyamid amphipods; monogeneans; and many species of nematodes, fungi, protozoans, bacteria, and viruses. Whether endoparasites or ectoparasites, each has a single host-species. Within that species, most individuals are free or almost free of parasites, while a minority carry a large number of parasites; this is known as an aggregated distribution.

==== Trophically transmitted ====
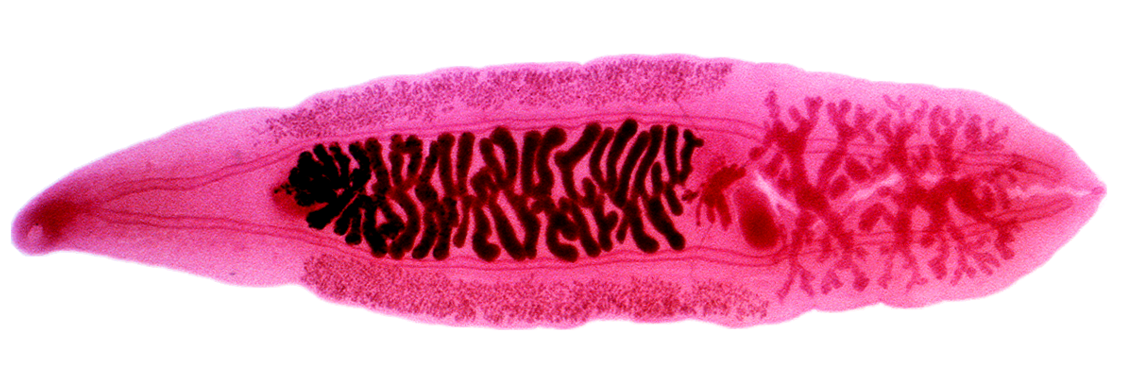
Clonorchis sinensis, the Chinese liver fluke, is trophically transmitted

Trophically-transmitted parasites are transmitted by being eaten by a host. They include trematodes (all except schistosomes), cestodes, acanthocephalans, pentastomids, many roundworms, and many protozoa such as Toxoplasma. They have complex life cycles involving hosts of two or more species. In their juvenile stages they infect and often encyst in the intermediate host. When the intermediate-host animal is eaten by a predator, the definitive host, the parasite survives the digestion process and matures into an adult; some live as intestinal parasites. Many trophically transmitted parasites modify the behaviour of their intermediate hosts, increasing their chances of being eaten by a predator. As with directly transmitted parasites, the distribution of trophically transmitted parasites among host individuals is aggregated. Coinfection by multiple parasites is common. Autoinfection, where (by exception) the whole of the parasite's life cycle takes place in a single primary host, can sometimes occur in helminths such as Strongyloides stercoralis.

==== Vector-transmitted ====
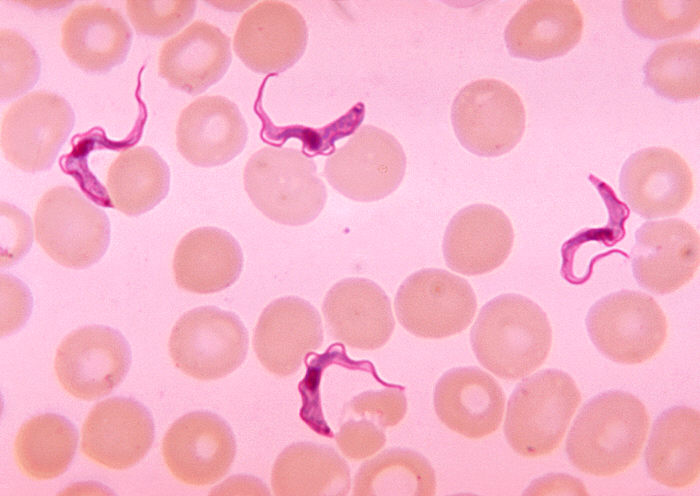
The vector-transmitted protozoan endoparasite Trypanosoma among human red blood cells

Vector-transmitted parasites rely on a third party, an intermediate host, where the parasite does not reproduce sexually, to carry them from one definitive host to another. These parasites are microorganisms, namely protozoa, bacteria, or viruses, often intracellular pathogens (disease-causers). Their vectors are mostly hematophagic arthropods such as fleas, lice, ticks, and mosquitoes. For example, the deer tick Ixodes scapularis acts as a vector for diseases including Lyme disease, babesiosis, and anaplasmosis. Protozoan endoparasites, such as the malarial parasites in the genus Plasmodium and sleeping-sickness parasites in the genus Trypanosoma, have infective stages in the host's blood which are transported to new hosts by biting insects.

==== Parasitoids ====
Parasitoids are insects which sooner or later kill their hosts, placing their relationship close to predation. Most parasitoids are parasitoid wasps or other hymenopterans; others include dipterans such as phorid flies. They can be divided into two groups, idiobionts and koinobionts, differing in their treatment of their hosts.

Idiobiont parasitoids sting their often-large prey on capture, either killing them outright or paralysing them immediately. The immobilised prey is then carried to a nest, sometimes alongside other prey if it is not large enough to support a parasitoid throughout its development. An egg is laid on top of the prey and the nest is then sealed. The parasitoid develops rapidly through its larval and pupal stages, feeding on the provisions left for it.

Koinobiont parasitoids, which include flies as well as wasps, lay their eggs inside young hosts, usually larvae. These are allowed to go on growing, so the host and parasitoid develop together for an extended period, ending when the parasitoids emerge as adults, leaving the prey dead, eaten from inside. Some koinobionts regulate their host's development, for example preventing it from pupating or making it moult whenever the parasitoid is ready to moult. They may do this by producing hormones that mimic the host's moulting hormones (ecdysteroids), or by regulating the host's endocrine system.

Idiobiont parasitoid wasps immediately paralyse their hosts for their larvae (Pimplinae, pictured) to eat.

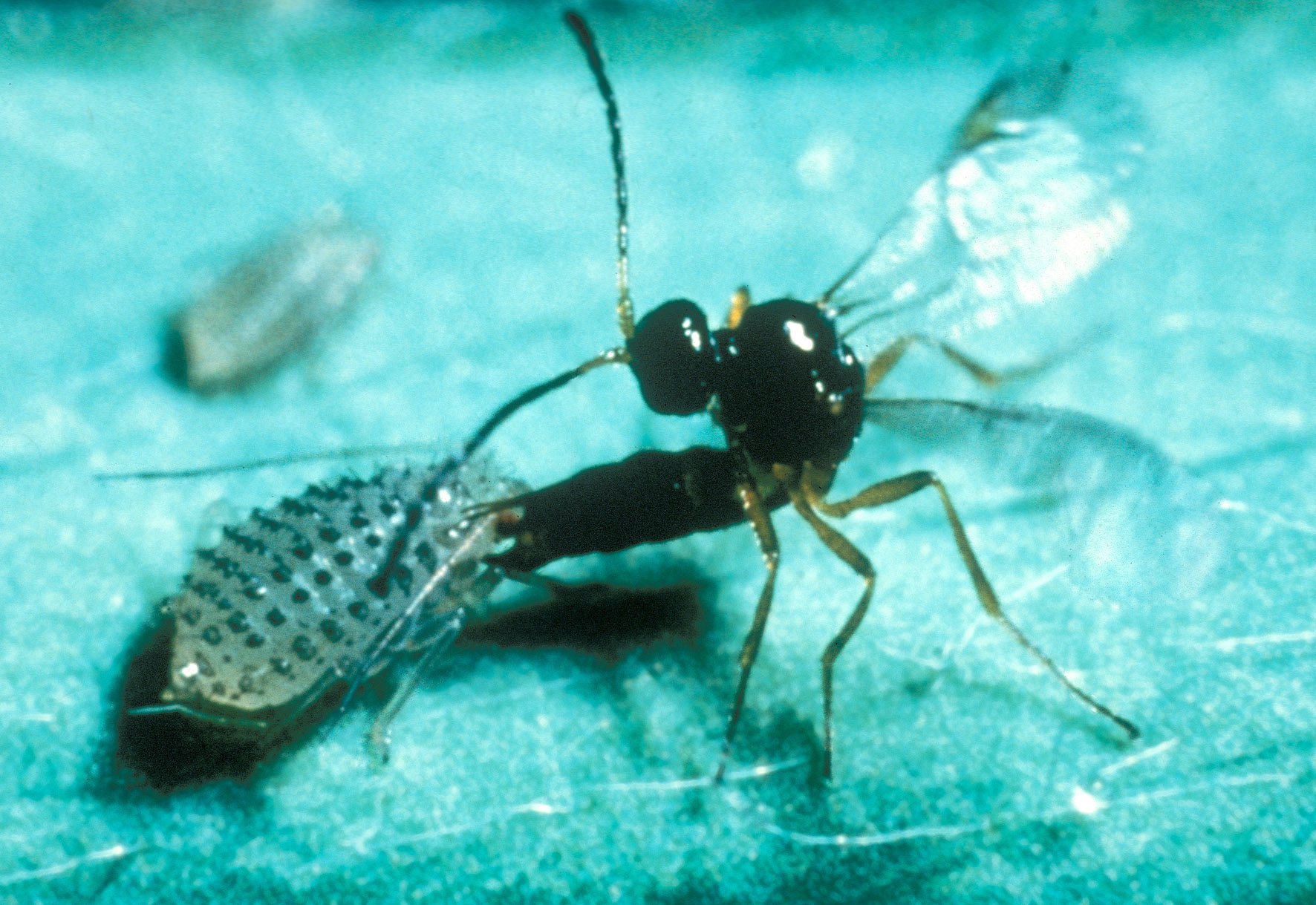
Koinobiont parasitoid wasps like this braconid lay their eggs via an ovipositor inside their hosts, which continue to grow and moult.

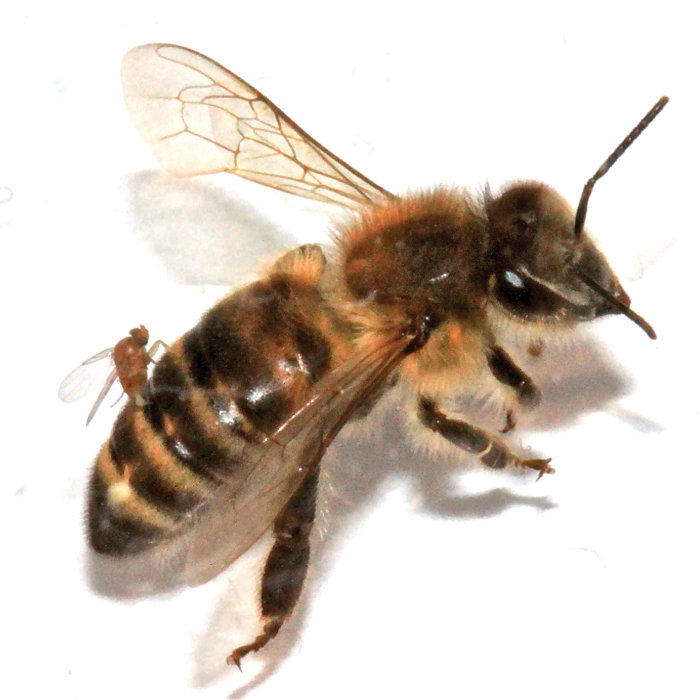
Phorid fly (centre left) is laying eggs in the abdomen of a worker honey-bee, altering its behaviour.

==== Micropredators ====
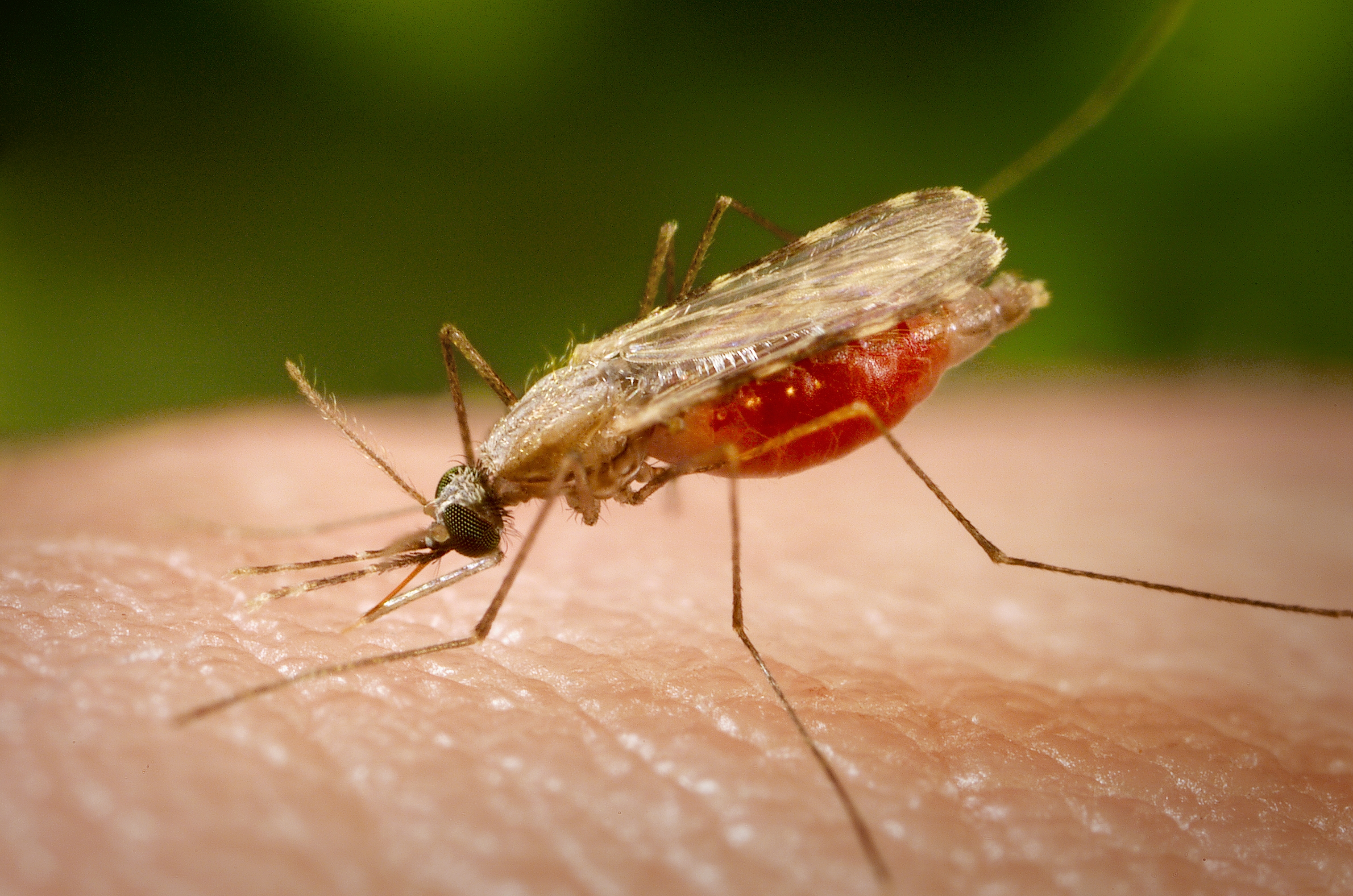
Mosquitoes are micropredators and important vectors of disease

A micropredator attacks more than one host, reducing each host's fitness by at least a small amount, and is only in contact with any one host intermittently. This behavior makes micropredators suitable as vectors, as they can pass smaller parasites from one host to another. Most micropredators are hematophagic, feeding on blood. They include annelids such as leeches, crustaceans such as branchiurans and gnathiid isopods, various dipterans such as mosquitoes and tsetse flies, other arthropods such as fleas and ticks, vertebrates such as lampreys, and mammals such as vampire bats.

=== Transmission strategies ===
Life cycle of Entamoeba histolytica, an anaerobic parasitic protozoan transmitted by the fecal–oral route

Parasites use a variety of methods to infect animal hosts, including physical contact, the fecal–oral route, free-living infectious stages, and vectors, suiting their differing hosts, life cycles, and ecological contexts. Examples to illustrate some of the many possible combinations are given in the table.

Examples of transmission methods in different ecological contexts
Parasite	Host	Transmission method	Ecological context
Gyrodactylus turnbulli (a monogenean)	Poecilia reticulata (guppy)	physical contact	social behaviour
Nematodes e.g. Strongyloides	Macaca fuscata (Japanese macaque)	fecal–oral	social behaviour (grooming)
Heligmosomoides polygyrus (a nematode)	Apodemus flavicollis (yellow-necked mouse)	fecal–oral	sex-biased transmission (mainly to males)
Amblyomma (a tick)	Sphenodon punctatus (tuatara)	free-living infectious stages	social behaviour
Plasmodium (malaria parasite)	Birds, mammals (inc. humans)	Anopheles mosquito vector, attracted by odour of infected human host	—

=== Variations ===
Among the many variations on parasitic strategies are hyperparasitism, social parasitism, brood parasitism, kleptoparasitism, sexual parasitism, and adelphoparasitism.

==== Hyperparasitism ====
Hyperparasites feed on another parasite, as exemplified by protozoa living in helminth parasites, or facultative or obligate parasitoids whose hosts are either conventional parasites or parasitoids. Levels of parasitism beyond secondary also occur, especially among facultative parasitoids. In oak gall systems, there can be up to four levels of parasitism.

Hyperparasites can control their hosts' populations, and are used for this purpose in agriculture and to some extent in medicine. The controlling effects can be seen in the way that the CHV1 virus helps to control the damage that chestnut blight, Cryphonectria parasitica, does to American chestnut trees, and in the way that bacteriophages can limit bacterial infections. It is likely, though little researched, that most pathogenic microparasites have hyperparasites which may prove widely useful in both agriculture and medicine.

==== Social parasitism ====
Social parasites take advantage of interspecific interactions between members of eusocial animals such as ants, termites, and bumblebees. Examples include the large blue butterfly, Phengaris arion, its larvae employing ant mimicry to parasitise certain ants, Bombus bohemicus, a bumblebee which invades the hives of other bees and takes over reproduction while their young are raised by host workers, and Melipona scutellaris, a eusocial bee whose virgin queens escape killer workers and invade another colony without a queen. An extreme example of interspecific social parasitism is found in the ant Tetramorium inquilinum, an obligate parasite which lives exclusively on the backs of other Tetramorium ants. A mechanism for the evolution of social parasitism was first proposed by Carlo Emery in 1909. Now known as "Emery's rule", it states that social parasites tend to be closely related to their hosts, often being in the same genus.

Intraspecific social parasitism occurs in parasitic nursing, where some individual young take milk from unrelated females. In wedge-capped capuchins, higher ranking females sometimes take milk from low ranking females without any reciprocation.

==== Brood parasitism ====
In brood parasitism, the hosts suffer increased parental investment and energy expenditure to feed parasitic young, which are commonly larger than host young. The growth rate of host nestlings is slowed, reducing the host's fitness. Brood parasites include birds in different families such as cowbirds, whydahs, cuckoos, and black-headed ducks. These do not build nests of their own, but leave their eggs in nests of other species. In the family Cuculidae, over 40% of cuckoo species are obligate brood parasites, while others are either facultative brood parasites or provide parental care. The eggs of some brood parasites mimic those of their hosts, while some cowbird eggs have tough shells, making them hard for the hosts to kill by piercing, both mechanisms implying selection by the hosts against parasitic eggs. The adult female European cuckoo further mimics a predator, the European sparrowhawk, giving her time to lay her eggs in the host's nest unobserved. Host species often combat parasitic egg mimicry through egg polymorphism, having two or more egg phenotypes within a single population of a species. Multiple phenotypes in host eggs decrease the probability of a parasitic species accurately "matching" their eggs to host eggs.

==== Kleptoparasitism ====
In kleptoparasitism (from Greek κλέπτης (kleptēs), "thief"), parasites steal food gathered by the host. The parasitism is often on close relatives, whether within the same species or between species in the same genus or family. For instance, the many lineages of cuckoo bees lay their eggs in the nest cells of other bees in the same family. Kleptoparasitism is uncommon generally but conspicuous in birds; some such as skuas are specialised in pirating food from other seabirds, relentlessly chasing them down until they disgorge their catch.

==== Sexual parasitism ====
A unique approach is seen in some species of anglerfish, such as Ceratias holboelli, where the males are reduced to tiny sexual parasites, wholly dependent on females of their own species for survival, permanently attached below the female's body, and unable to fend for themselves. The female nourishes the male and protects him from predators, while the male gives nothing back except the sperm that the female needs to produce the next generation.

==== Adelphoparasitism ====
Adelphoparasitism, (from Greek ἀδελφός (adelphós), brother), also known as sibling-parasitism, occurs where the host species is closely related to the parasite, often in the same family or genus. In the citrus blackfly parasitoid, Encarsia perplexa, unmated females may lay haploid eggs in the fully developed larvae of their own species, producing male offspring, while the marine worm Bonellia viridis has a similar reproductive strategy, although the larvae are planktonic.

==== Illustrations ====
Examples of the major variant strategies are illustrated.

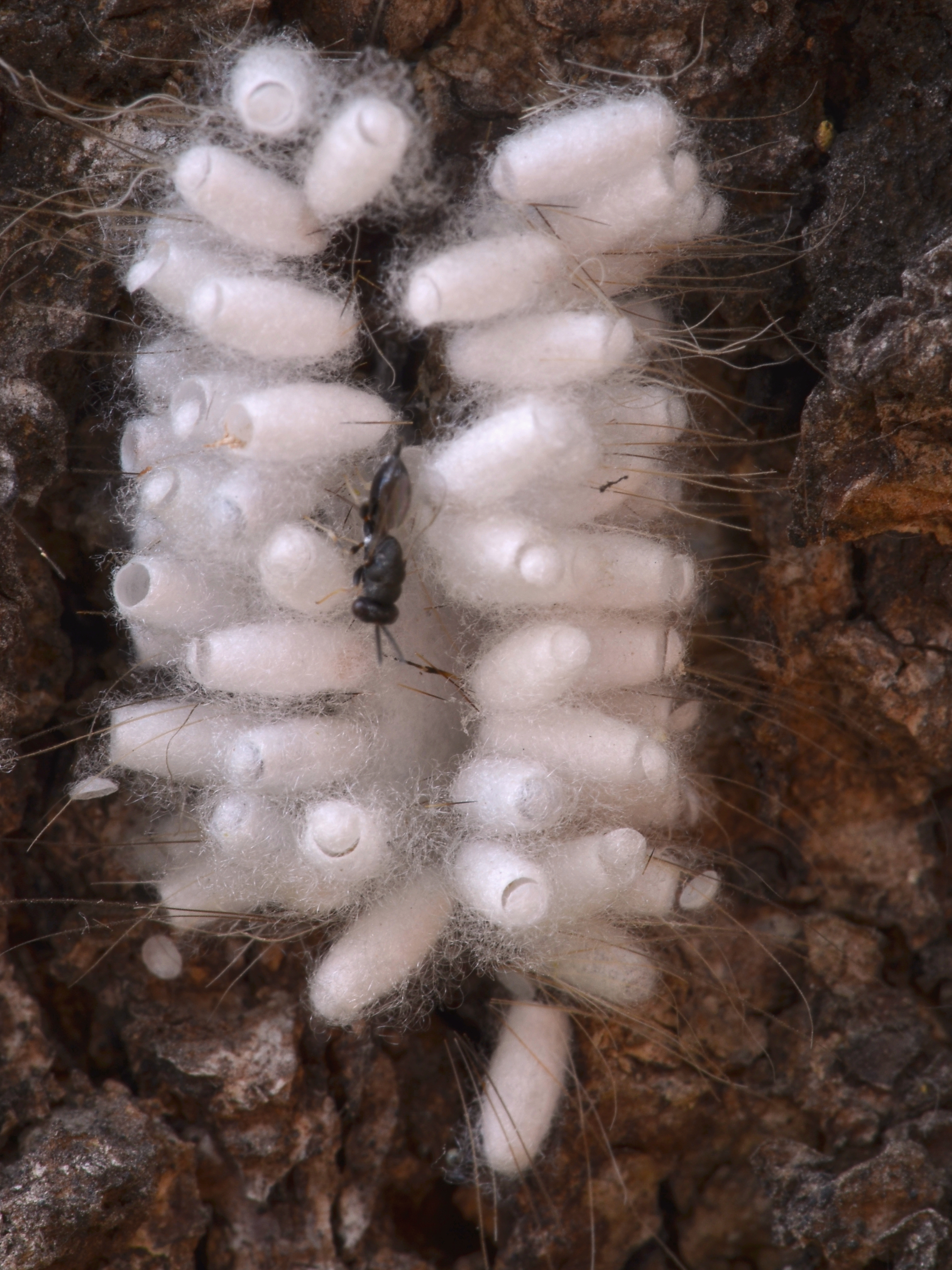
A hyperparasitoid pteromalid wasp on the cocoons of its host, itself a parasitoid braconid wasp

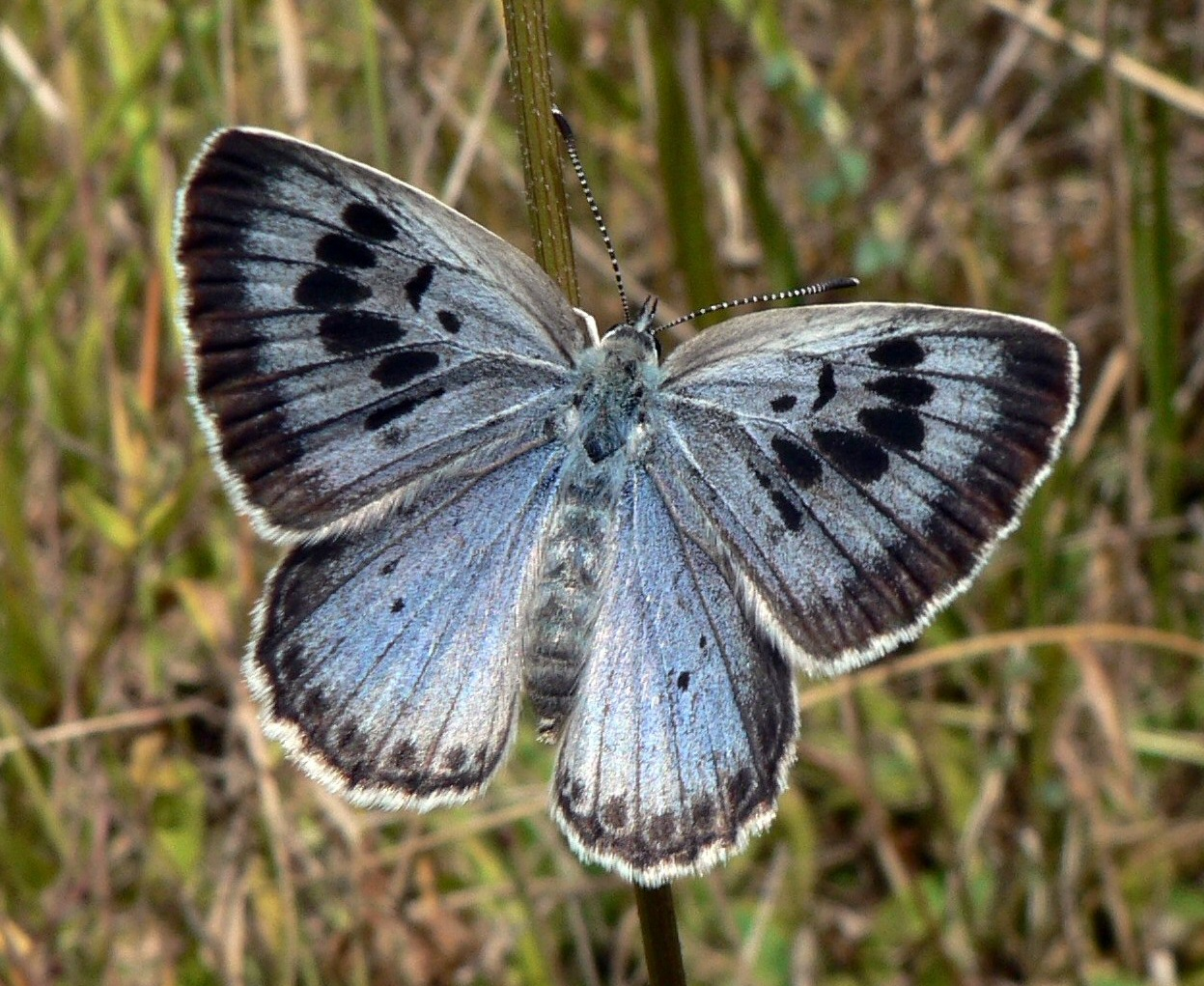
The large blue butterfly is an ant mimic and social parasite.

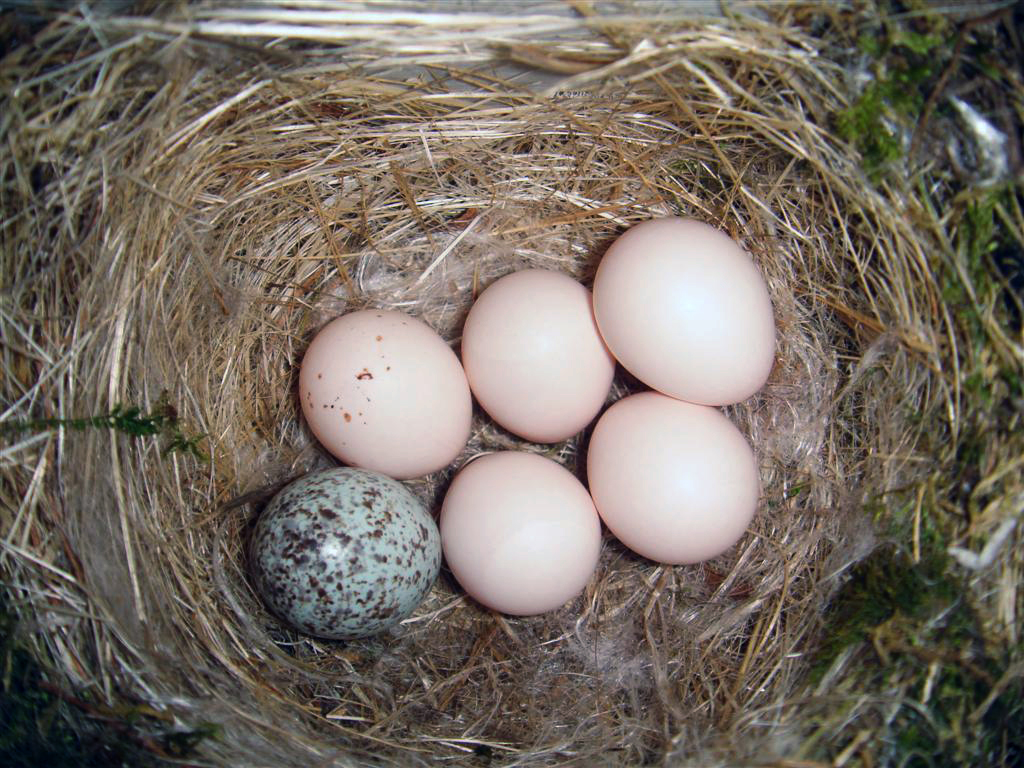
In brood parasitism, the host raises the young of another species: here a cowbird's egg in an Eastern phoebe's nest.

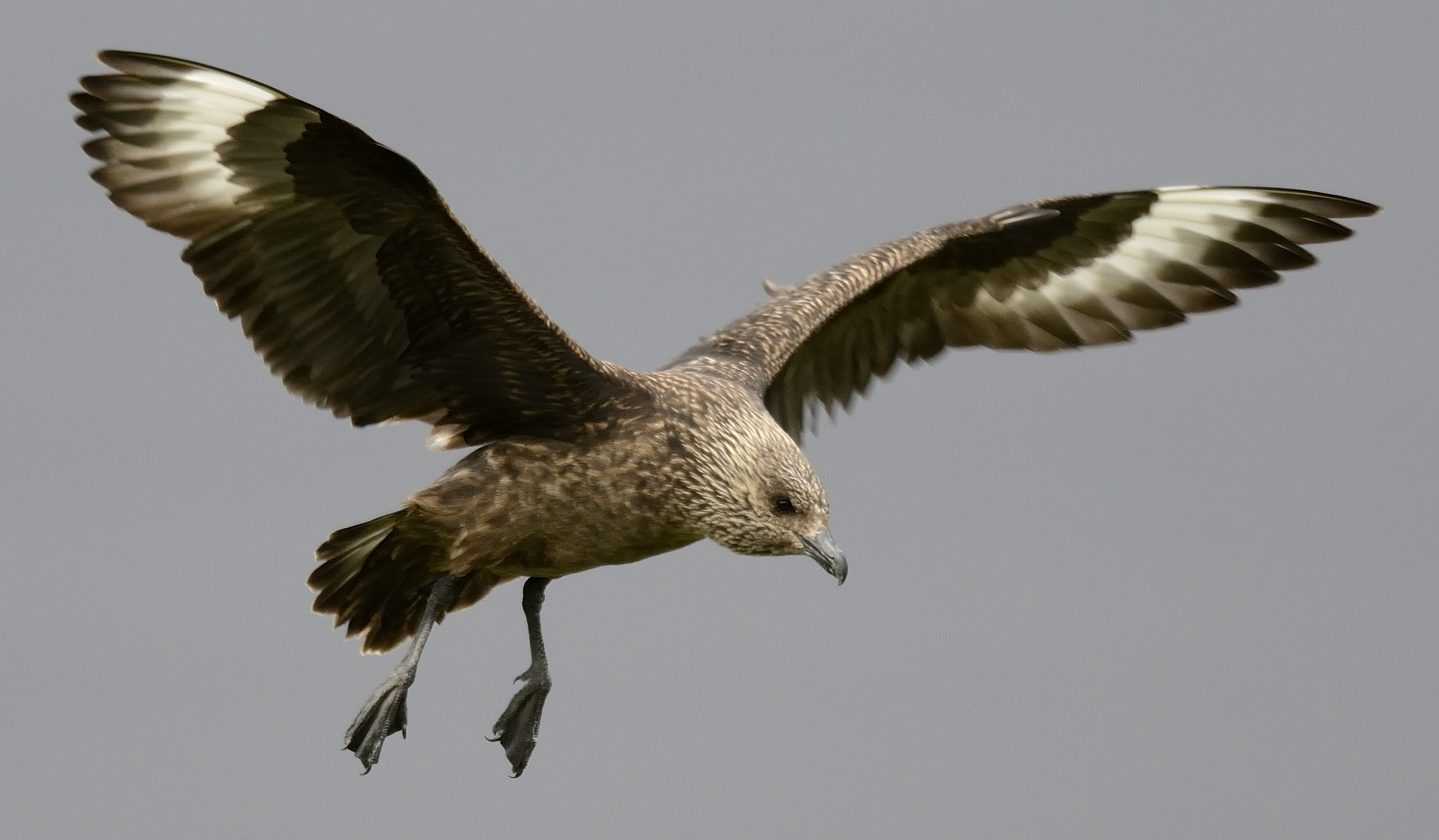
The great skua is a powerful kleptoparasite, relentlessly pursuing other seabirds until they disgorge their catches of food.

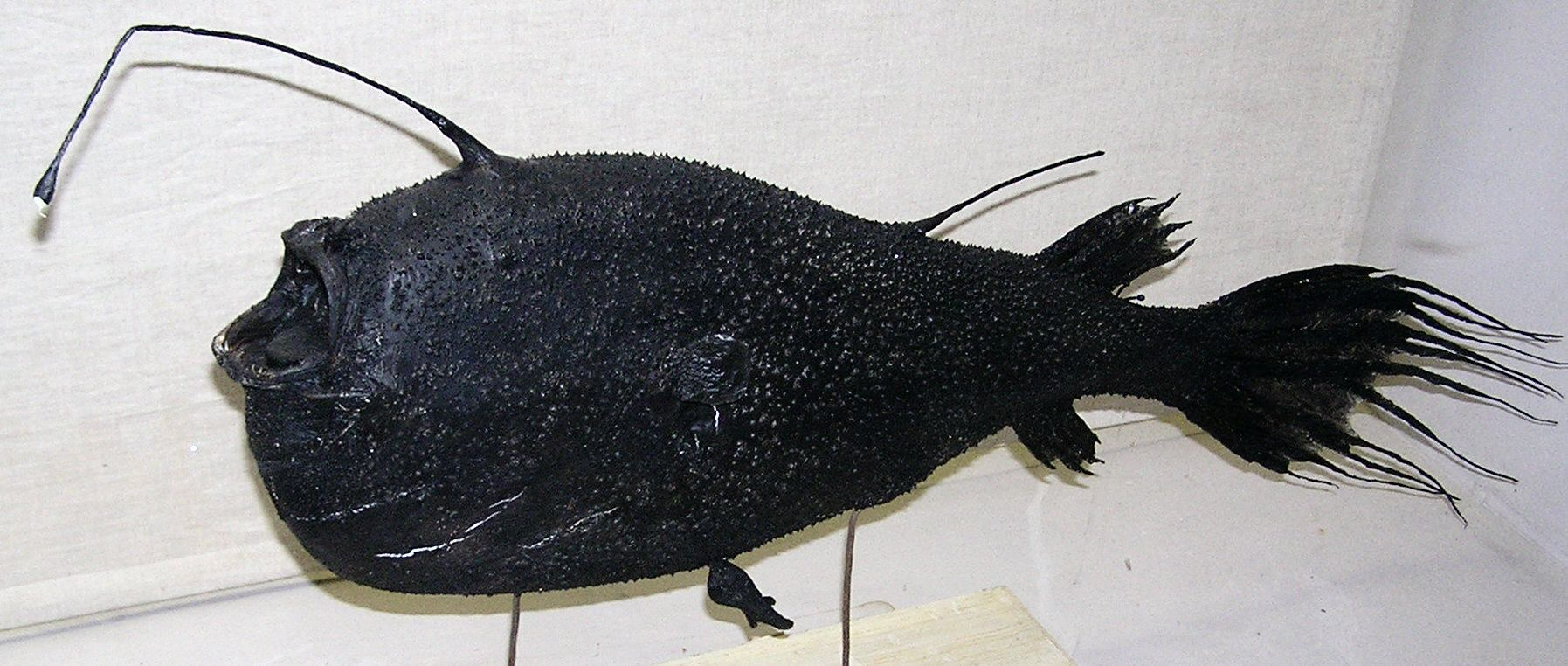
The male of the anglerfish species Ceratias holboelli lives as a tiny sexual parasite permanently attached below the female's body.

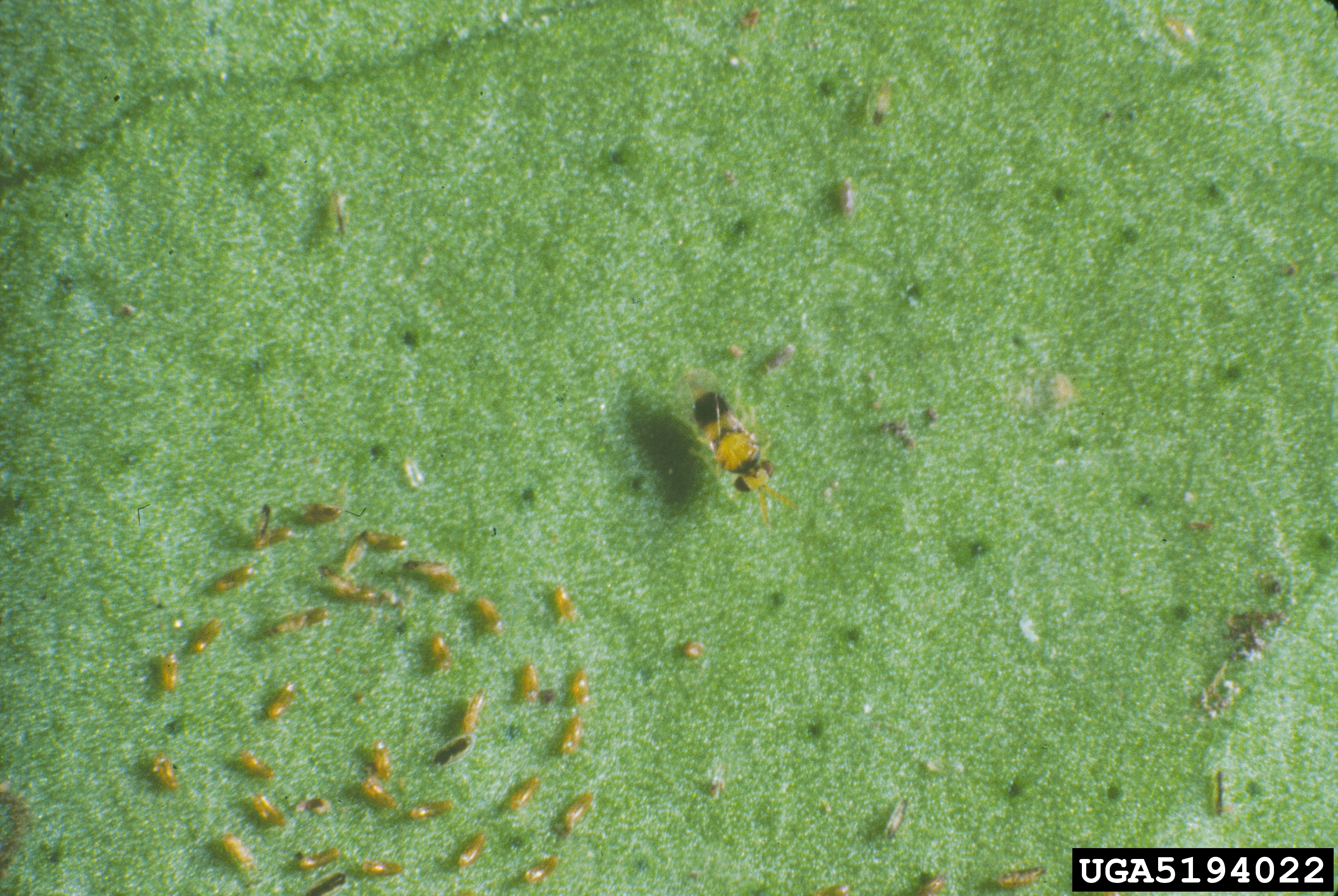
Encarsia perplexa (centre), a parasitoid of citrus blackfly (lower left), is also an adelphoparasite, laying eggs in larvae of its own species

== Taxonomic range ==
Parasitism has an extremely wide taxonomic range, including animals, plants, fungi, protozoans, bacteria, and viruses.

=== Animals ===
Major parasitic animal groups
Phylum	Class/Order	No. of species	Endo- paras.	Ecto- paras.	Invert def. host	Vert def. host	No. of hosts	Marine	Fresh- water	Terres- trial
Cnidaria	Myxozoans	1,350	Yes			Yes	2 or more	Yes	Yes	
Cnidaria	Polypodiozoans	1	Yes			Yes	1		Yes	
Flatworms	Trematodes	15,000	Yes			Yes	2 or more	Yes	Yes	Yes
Flatworms	Monogeneans	20,000		Yes		Yes	1	Yes	Yes	
Flatworms	Cestodes	5,000	Yes			Yes	2 or more	Yes	Yes	Yes
Horsehair worms		350	Yes		Yes		1 or more		Yes	Yes
Nematodes		10,500	Yes		Yes	Yes	1 or more	Yes	Yes	Yes
Acanthocephala		1,200	Yes			Yes	2 or more	Yes	Yes	Yes
Annelids	Leeches	400		Yes		Yes	1	Yes	Yes	
Molluscs	Bivalves	600		Yes		Yes	1		Yes	
Molluscs	Gastropods	5,000		Yes		Yes	1	Yes		
Arthropods	Ticks	800		Yes		Yes	1 or more			Yes
Arthropods	Mites	30,000	Yes	Yes	Yes	Yes	1	Yes	Yes	Yes
Arthropods	Copepods	4,000		Yes	Yes	Yes	1	Yes	Yes	
Arthropods	Lice	4,000		Yes		Yes	1			Yes
Arthropods	Fleas	2,500		Yes		Yes	1			Yes
Arthropods	True flies	2,300		Yes		Yes	1			Yes
Arthropods	Twisted-wing insects	600	Yes		Yes		1			Yes
Arthropods	Parasitoid wasps	130,000 - 1,100,000	Yes	Yes	Yes		1			Yes

Parasitism is widespread in the animal kingdom, and has evolved independently from free-living forms hundreds of times. Many types of helminth including flukes and cestodes have complete life cycles involving two or more hosts. By far the largest group is the parasitoid wasps in the Hymenoptera. The phyla and classes with the largest numbers of parasitic species are listed in the table. Numbers are conservative minimum estimates. The columns for Endo- and Ecto-parasitism refer to the definitive host, as documented in the Vertebrate and Invertebrate columns.

=== Plants ===
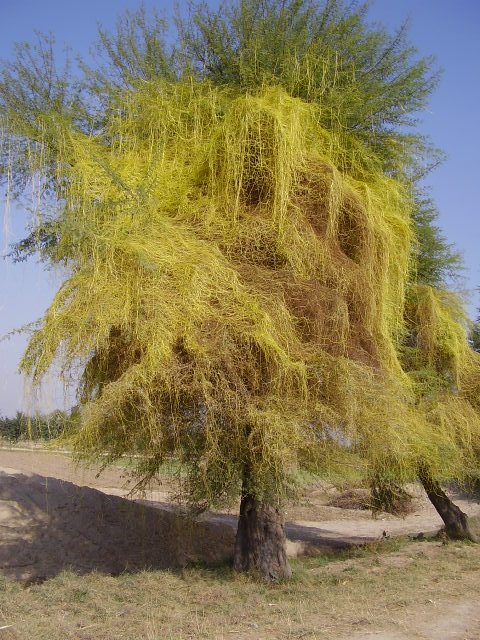
Cuscuta (a dodder), a stem holoparasite, on an acacia tree

A hemiparasite or partial parasite such as mistletoe derives some of its nutrients from another living plant, whereas a holoparasite such as Cuscuta derives all of its nutrients from another plant. Parasitic plants make up about one per cent of angiosperms and are in almost every biome in the world. All these plants have modified roots, haustoria, which penetrate the host plants, connecting them to the conductive system—either the xylem, the phloem, or both. This provides them with the ability to extract water and nutrients from the host. A parasitic plant is classified depending on where it latches onto the host, either the stem or the root, and the amount of nutrients it requires. Since holoparasites have no chlorophyll and therefore cannot make food for themselves by photosynthesis, they are always obligate parasites, deriving all their food from their hosts. Some parasitic plants can locate their host plants by detecting chemicals in the air or soil given off by host shoots or roots, respectively. About 4,500 species of parasitic plant in approximately 20 families of flowering plants are known.

Species within the Orobanchaceae (broomrapes) are among the most economically destructive of all plants. Species of Striga (witchweeds) are estimated to cost billions of dollars a year in crop yield loss, infesting over 50 million hectares of cultivated land within Sub-Saharan Africa alone. Striga infects both grasses and grains, including corn, rice, and sorghum, which are among the world's most important food crops. Orobanche also threatens a wide range of other important crops, including peas, chickpeas, tomatoes, carrots, and varieties of cabbage. Yield loss from Orobanche can be total; despite extensive research, no method of control has been entirely successful.

Many plants and fungi exchange carbon and nutrients in mutualistic mycorrhizal relationships. Some 400 species of myco-heterotrophic plants, mostly in the tropics, however effectively cheat by taking carbon from a fungus rather than exchanging it for minerals. They have much reduced roots, as they do not need to absorb water from the soil; their stems are slender with few vascular bundles, and their leaves are reduced to small scales, as they do not photosynthesize. Their seeds are small and numerous, so they appear to rely on being infected by a suitable fungus soon after germinating.

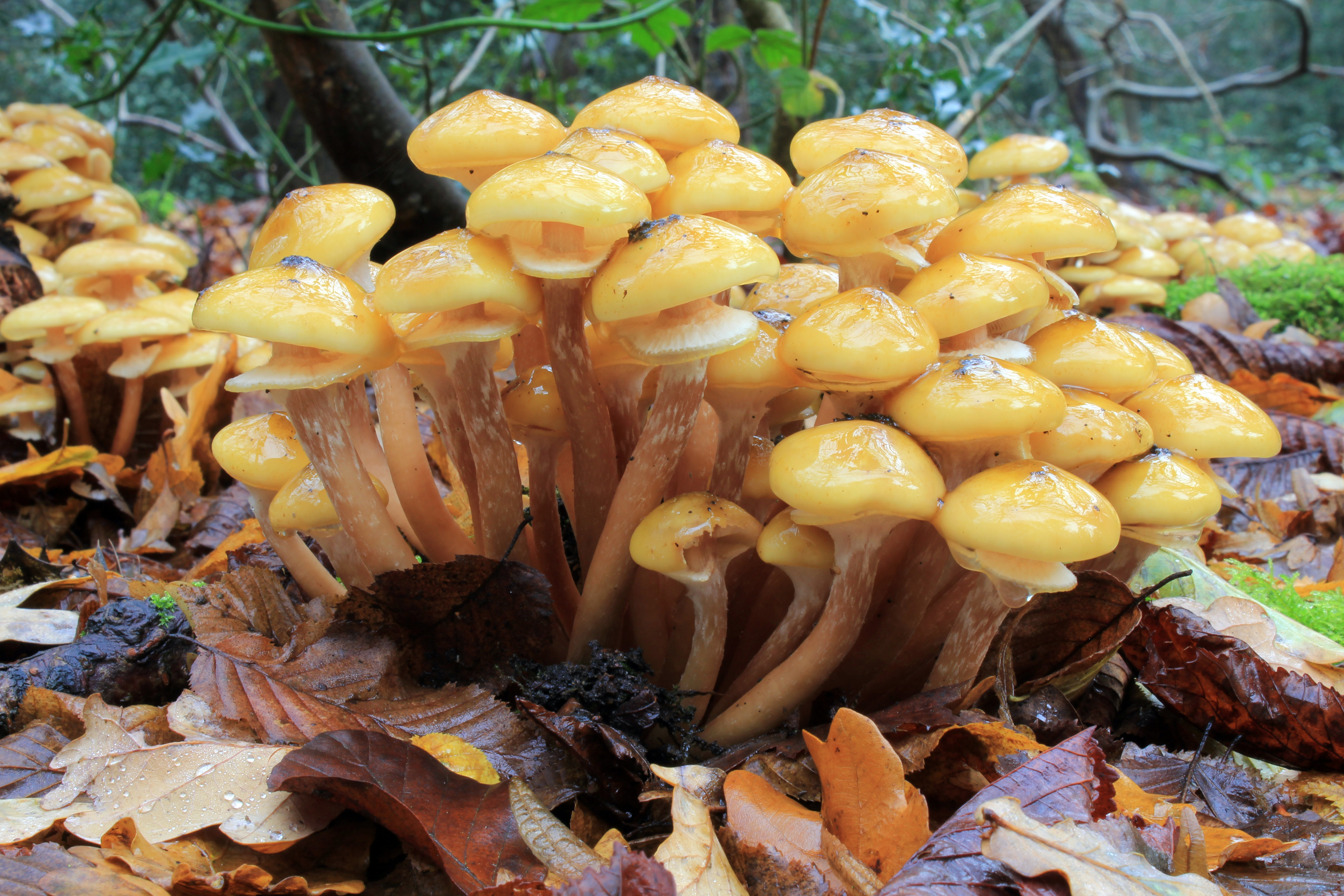
The honey fungus, Armillaria mellea, is a parasite of trees, and a saprophyte feeding on the trees it has killed.

=== Fungi ===
Parasitic fungi derive some or all of their nutritional requirements from plants, other fungi, or animals.

Plant pathogenic fungi are classified into three categories depending on their mode of nutrition: biotrophs, hemibiotrophs and necrotrophs. Biotrophic fungi derive nutrients from living plant cells, and during the course of infection they colonise their plant host in such a way as to keep it alive for a maximally long time. One well-known example of a biotrophic pathogen is Ustilago maydis, causative agent of the corn smut disease. Necrotrophic pathogens on the other hand, kill host cells and feed saprophytically, an example being the root-colonising honey fungi in the genus Armillaria. Hemibiotrophic pathogens begin their colonising their hosts as biotrophs, and subsequently killing off host cells and feeding as necrotrophs, a phenomenon termed the biotrophy-necrotrophy switch.

Pathogenic fungi are well-known causative agents of diseases on animals as well as humans. Fungal infections (mycosis) are estimated to kill 1.6 million people each year. One example of a potent fungal animal pathogen are Microsporidia - obligate intracellular parasitic fungi that largely affect insects, but may also affect vertebrates including humans, causing the intestinal infection microsporidiosis.

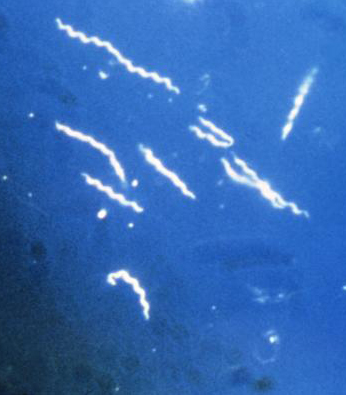
Borrelia burgdorferi, the bacterium that causes Lyme disease, is transmitted by Ixodes ticks.

=== Protozoa ===
Protozoa such as Plasmodium, Trypanosoma, and Entamoeba are endoparasitic. They cause serious diseases in vertebrates including humans—in these examples, malaria, sleeping sickness, and amoebic dysentery—and have complex life cycles.

=== Bacteria ===
Many bacteria are parasitic, though they are more generally thought of as pathogens causing disease. Parasitic bacteria are extremely diverse, and infect their hosts by a variety of routes. To give a few examples, Bacillus anthracis, the cause of anthrax, is spread by contact with infected domestic animals; its spores, which can survive for years outside the body, can enter a host through an abrasion or may be inhaled. Borrelia, the cause of Lyme disease and relapsing fever, is transmitted by vectors, ticks of the genus Ixodes, from the diseases' reservoirs in animals such as deer. Campylobacter jejuni, a cause of gastroenteritis, is spread by the fecal–oral route from animals, or by eating insufficiently cooked poultry, or by contaminated water. Haemophilus influenzae, an agent of bacterial meningitis and respiratory tract infections such as influenza and bronchitis, is transmitted by droplet contact. Treponema pallidum, the cause of syphilis, is spread by sexual activity.

Enterobacteria phage T4 is a bacteriophage virus. It infects its host, Escherichia coli, by injecting its DNA through its tail, which attaches to the bacterium's surface.

=== Viruses ===
Viruses are obligate intracellular parasites, characterised by extremely limited biological function, to the point where, while they are evidently able to infect all other organisms from bacteria and archaea to animals, plants and fungi, it is unclear whether they can themselves be described as living. They can be either RNA or DNA viruses consisting of a single or double strand of genetic material (RNA or DNA, respectively), covered in a protein coat and sometimes a lipid envelope. They thus lack all the usual machinery of the cell such as enzymes, relying entirely on the host cell's ability to replicate DNA and synthesise proteins. Most viruses are bacteriophages, infecting bacteria.

== Evolutionary ecology ==
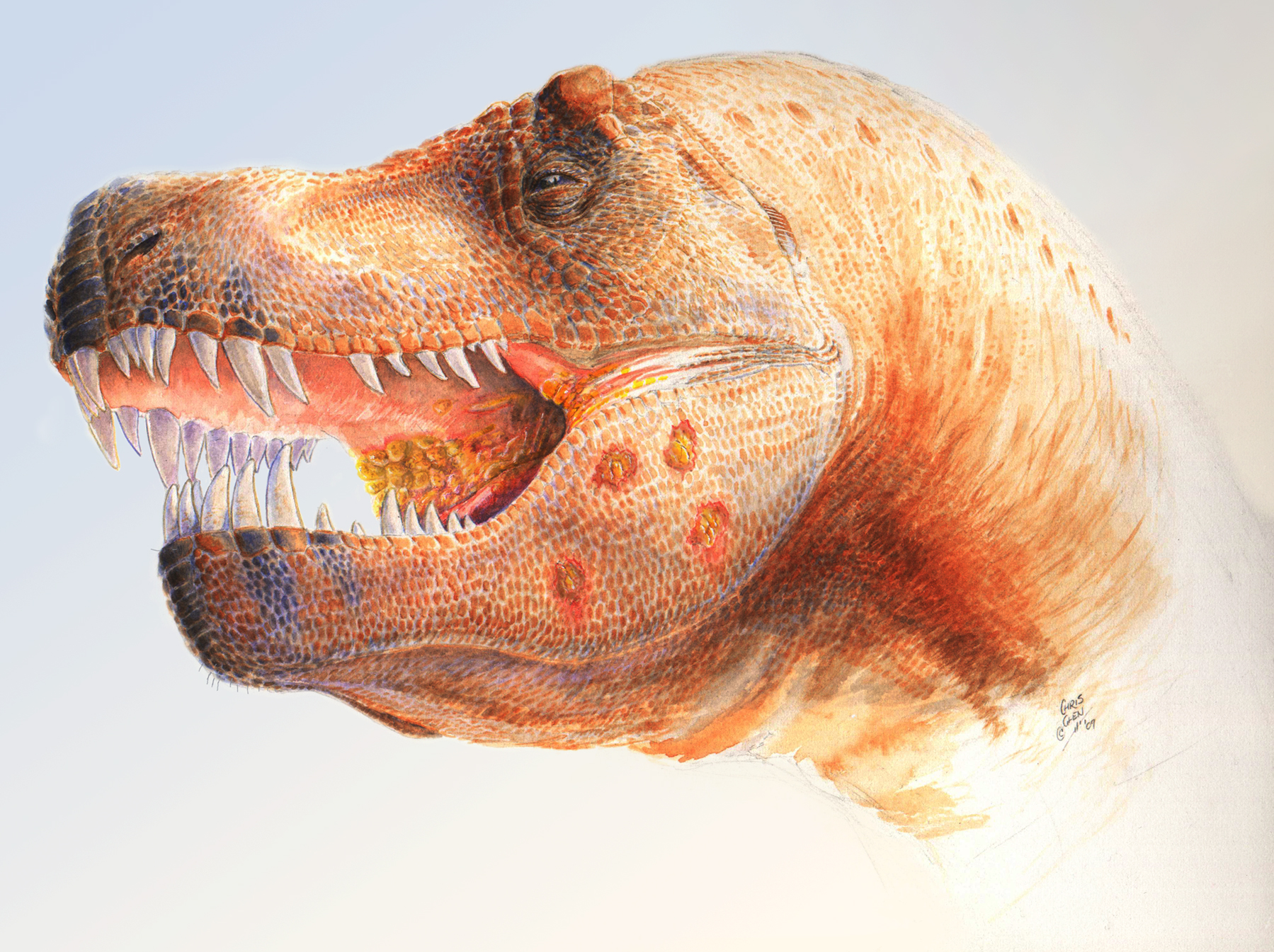
Restoration of a Tyrannosaurus with holes possibly caused by a Trichomonas-like parasite

Parasitism is a major aspect of evolutionary ecology; for example, almost all free-living animals are host to at least one species of parasite. Vertebrates, the best-studied group, are hosts to between 75,000 and 300,000 species of helminths and an uncounted number of parasitic microorganisms. On average, a mammal species hosts four species of nematode, two of trematodes, and two of cestodes. Humans have 342 species of helminth parasites, and 70 species of protozoan parasites. Some three-quarters of the links in food webs include a parasite, important in regulating host numbers. Perhaps 40 per cent of described species are parasitic.

=== Fossil record ===
Parasitism is hard to demonstrate from the fossil record, but holes in the mandibles of several specimens of Tyrannosaurus may have been caused by Trichomonas-like parasites. Saurophthirus, the Early Cretaceous flea, parasitized pterosaurs. Eggs that belonged to nematode worms and probably protozoan cysts were found in the Late Triassic coprolite of phytosaur. This rare find in Thailand reveals more about the ecology of prehistoric parasites.

=== Coevolution ===
As hosts and parasites evolve together, their relationships often change. When a parasite is in a sole relationship with a host, selection drives the relationship to become more benign, even mutualistic, as the parasite can reproduce for longer if its host lives longer. But where parasites are competing, selection favours the parasite that reproduces fastest, leading to increased virulence. There are thus varied possibilities in host–parasite coevolution.

Evolutionary epidemiology analyses how parasites spread and evolve, whereas Darwinian medicine applies similar evolutionary thinking to non-parasitic diseases like cancer and autoimmune conditions.

==== Long-term partnerships favouring mutualism ====
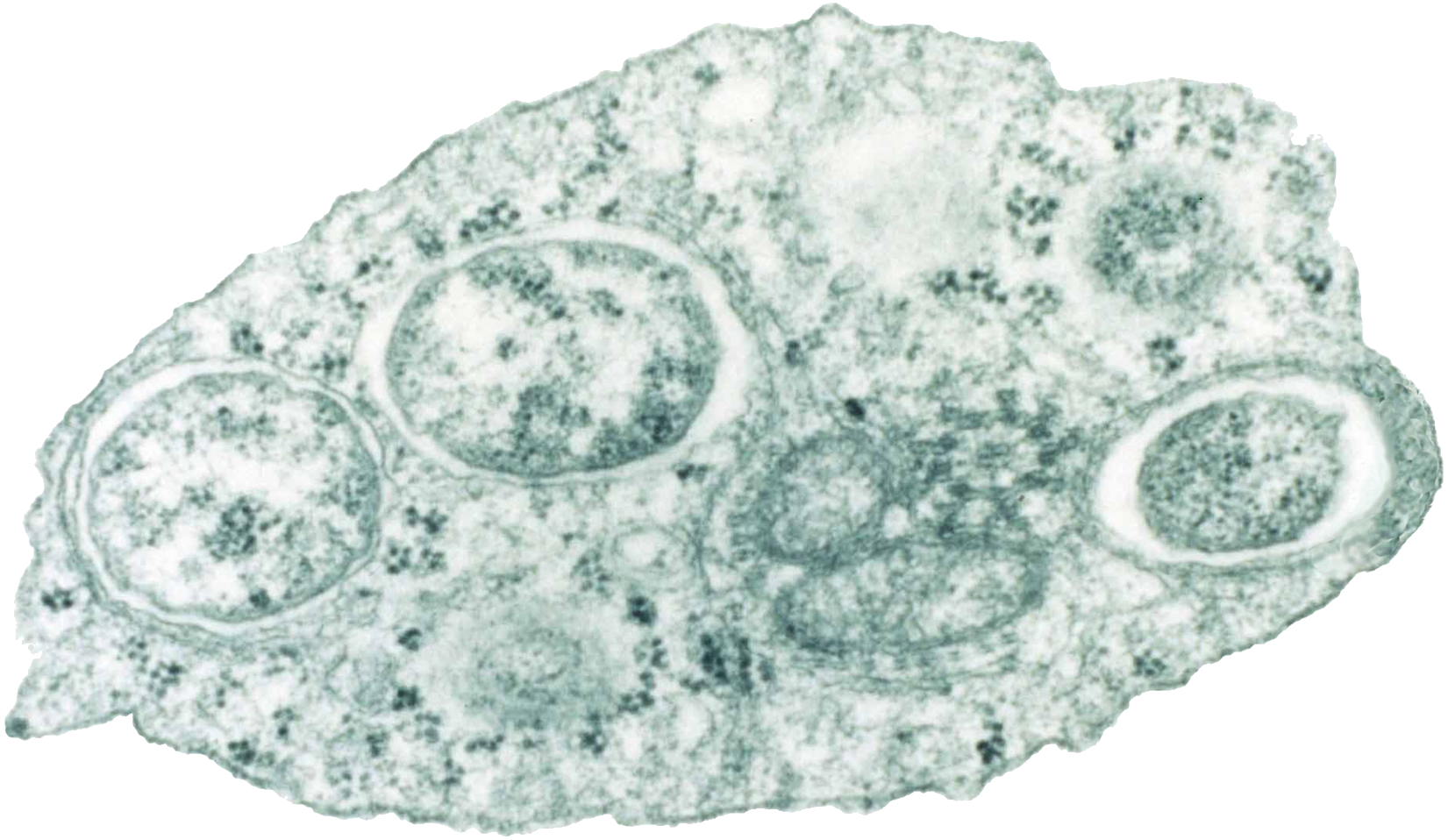
Wolbachia bacteria within an insect cell

Long-term partnerships can lead to a relatively stable relationship tending to commensalism or mutualism, as, all else being equal, it is in the evolutionary interest of the parasite that its host thrives. A parasite may evolve to become less harmful for its host or a host may evolve to cope with the unavoidable presence of a parasite—to the point that the parasite's absence causes the host harm. For example, although animals parasitised by worms are often clearly harmed, such infections may also reduce the prevalence and effects of autoimmune disorders in animal hosts, including humans. In a more extreme example, some nematode worms cannot reproduce, or even survive, without infection by Wolbachia bacteria.

Lynn Margulis and others have argued, following Peter Kropotkin's 1902 Mutual Aid: A Factor of Evolution, that natural selection drives relationships from parasitism to mutualism when resources are limited. This process may have been involved in the symbiogenesis which formed the eukaryotes from an intracellular relationship between archaea and bacteria, though the sequence of events remains largely undefined.

==== Competition favouring virulence ====
Competition between parasites can be expected to favour faster reproducing and therefore more virulent parasites, by natural selection.

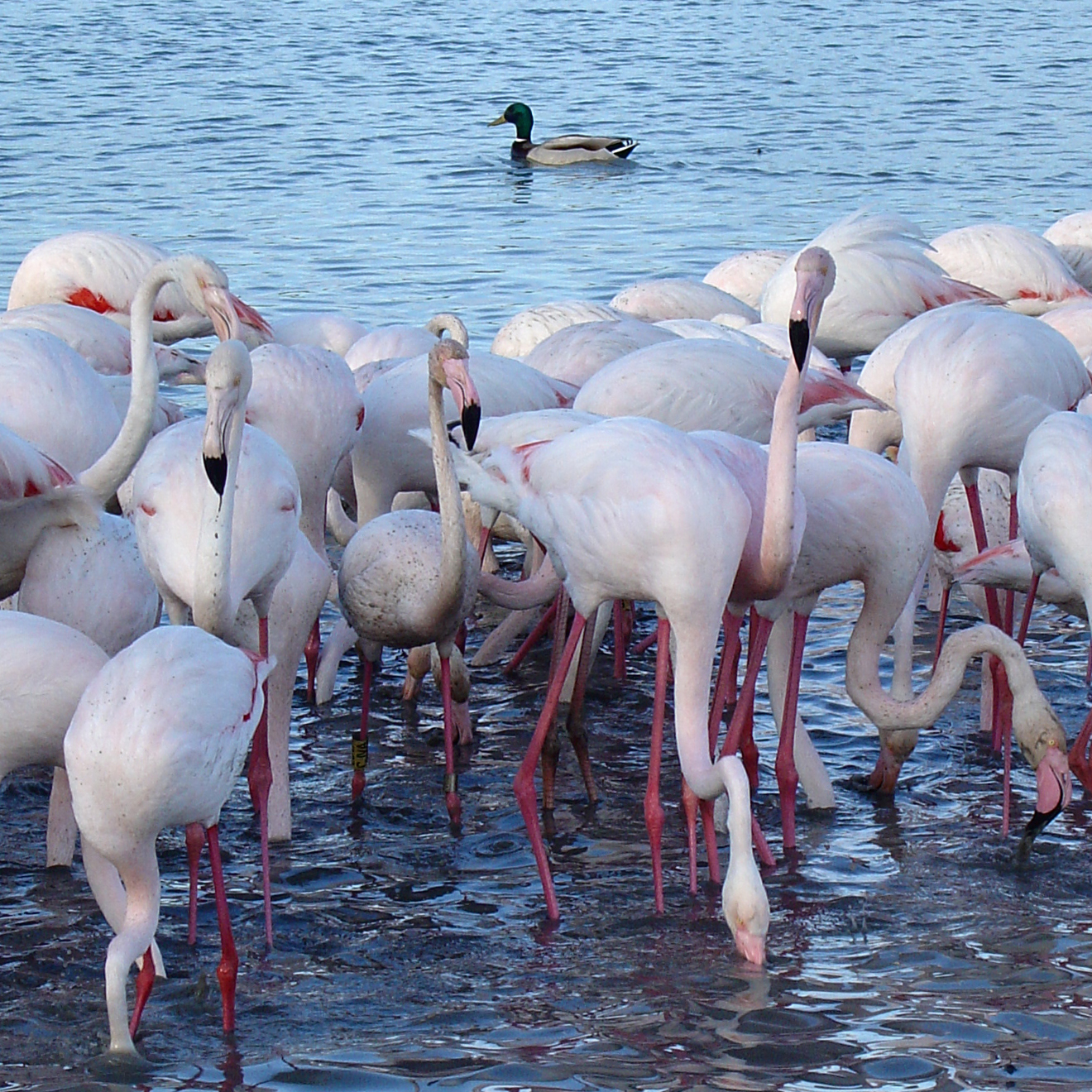
Biologists long suspected cospeciation of flamingos and ducks with their parasitic lice, which were similar in the two families. Cospeciation did occur, but it led to flamingos and grebes, with a later host switch of flamingo lice to ducks.

Among competing parasitic insect-killing bacteria of the genera Photorhabdus and Xenorhabdus, virulence depended on the relative potency of the antimicrobial toxins (bacteriocins) produced by the two strains involved. When only one bacterium could kill the other, the other strain was excluded by the competition. But when caterpillars were infected with bacteria both of which had toxins able to kill the other strain, neither strain was excluded, and their virulence was less than when the insect was infected by a single strain.

==== Cospeciation ====
A parasite sometimes undergoes cospeciation with its host, resulting in the pattern described in Fahrenholz's rule, that the phylogenies of the host and parasite come to mirror each other.

An example is between the simian foamy virus (SFV) and its primate hosts. The phylogenies of SFV polymerase and the mitochondrial cytochrome c oxidase subunit II from African and Asian primates were found to be closely congruent in branching order and divergence times, implying that the simian foamy viruses cospeciated with Old World primates for at least 30 million years.

The presumption of a shared evolutionary history between parasites and hosts can help elucidate how host taxa are related. For instance, there has been a dispute about whether flamingos are more closely related to storks or ducks. The fact that flamingos share parasites with ducks and geese was initially taken as evidence that these groups were more closely related to each other than either is to storks. However, evolutionary events such as the duplication, or the extinction of parasite species (without similar events on the host phylogeny) often erode similarities between host and parasite phylogenies. In the case of flamingos, they have similar lice to those of grebes. Flamingos and grebes do have a common ancestor, implying cospeciation of birds and lice in these groups. Flamingo lice then switched hosts to ducks, creating the situation which had confused biologists.

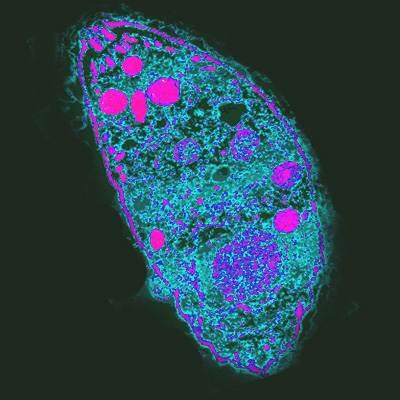
The protozoan Toxoplasma gondii facilitates its transmission by inducing behavioral changes in rats through infection of neurons in their central nervous system.

Parasites infect sympatric hosts (those within their same geographical area) more effectively, as has been shown with digenetic trematodes infecting lake snails. This is in line with the Red Queen hypothesis, which states that interactions between species lead to constant natural selection for coadaptation. Parasites track the locally common hosts' phenotypes, so the parasites are less infective to allopatric hosts, those from different geographical regions.

=== Modifying host behaviour ===
Some parasites modify host behaviour in order to increase their transmission between hosts, often in relation to predator and prey (parasite increased trophic transmission). For example, in the California coastal salt marsh, the fluke Euhaplorchis californiensis reduces the ability of its killifish host to avoid predators. This parasite matures in egrets, which are more likely to feed on infected killifish than on uninfected fish. Another example is the protozoan Toxoplasma gondii, a parasite that matures in cats but can be carried by many other mammals. Uninfected rats avoid cat odors, but rats infected with T. gondii are drawn to this scent, which may increase transmission to feline hosts. The malaria parasite modifies the skin odour of its human hosts, increasing their attractiveness to mosquitoes and hence improving the chance for the parasite to be transmitted. The spider Cyclosa argenteoalba often have parasitoid wasp larvae attached to them which alter their web-building behavior. Instead of producing their normal sticky spiral shaped webs, they made simplified webs when the parasites were attached. This manipulated behavior lasted longer and was more prominent the longer the parasites were left on the spiders.

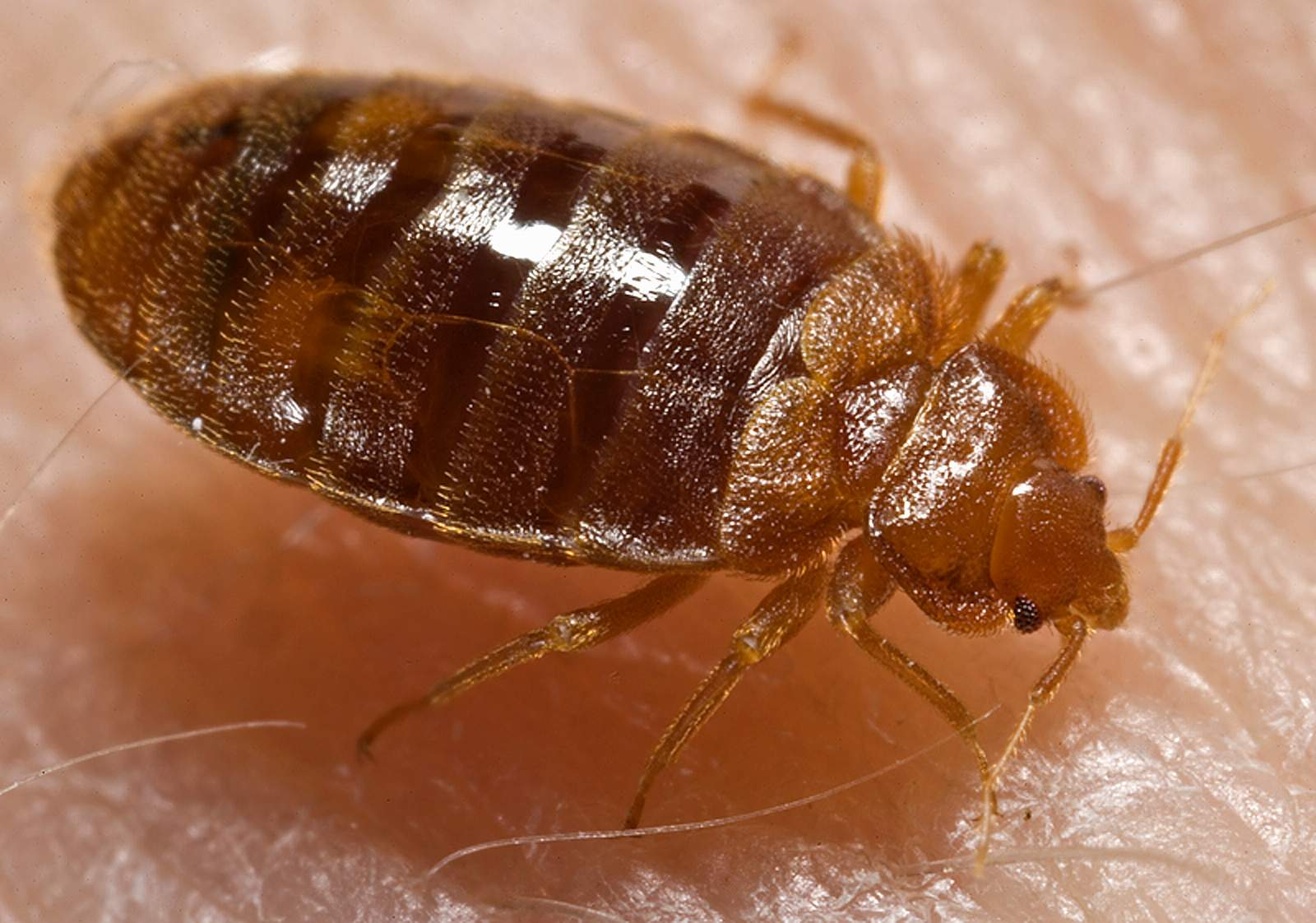
Trait loss: bedbug Cimex lectularius is flightless, like many insect ectoparasites.

=== Trait loss ===
Parasites can exploit their hosts to carry out a number of functions that they would otherwise have to carry out for themselves. Parasites which lose those functions then have a selective advantage, as they can divert resources to reproduction. Many insect ectoparasites including bedbugs, batbugs, lice and fleas have lost their ability to fly, relying instead on their hosts for transport. Trait loss more generally is widespread among parasites. An extreme example is the myxosporean Henneguya zschokkei, an ectoparasite of fish and the only animal known to have lost the ability to respire aerobically: its cells lack mitochondria.

=== Host defences ===
Hosts have evolved a variety of defensive measures against their parasites, including physical barriers like the skin of vertebrates, the immune system of mammals, insects actively removing parasites, and defensive chemicals in plants.

The evolutionary biologist W. D. Hamilton suggested that sexual reproduction could have evolved to help to defeat multiple parasites by enabling genetic recombination, the shuffling of genes to create varied combinations. Hamilton showed by mathematical modelling that sexual reproduction would be evolutionarily stable in different situations, and that the theory's predictions matched the actual ecology of sexual reproduction. However, there may be a trade-off between immunocompetence and breeding male vertebrate hosts' secondary sex characteristics, such as the plumage of peacocks and the manes of lions. This is because the male hormone testosterone encourages the growth of secondary sex characteristics, favouring such males in sexual selection, at the price of reducing their immune defences.

==== Vertebrates ====
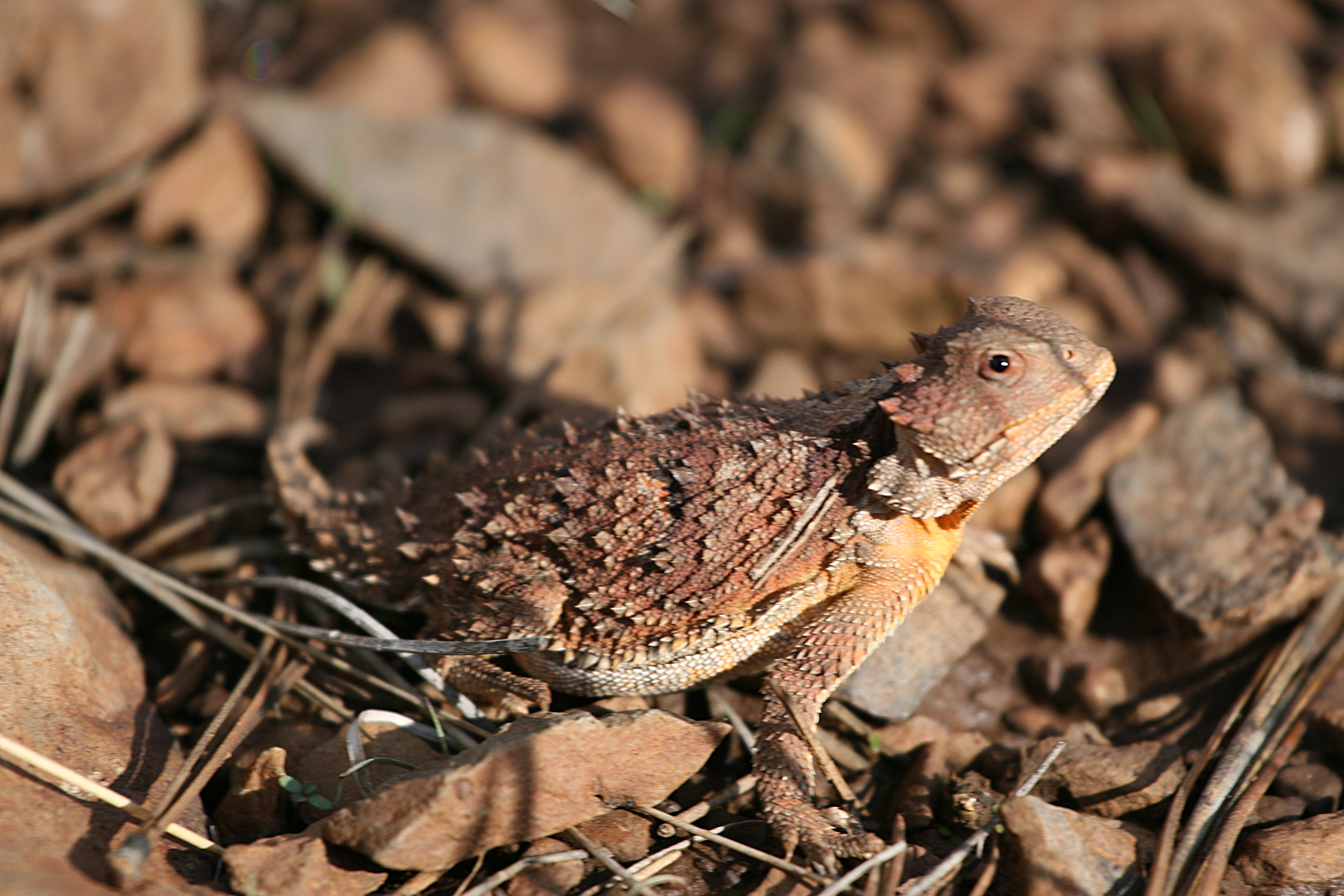
The dry skin of vertebrates such as the short-horned lizard prevents the entry of many parasites.

The physical barrier of the tough and often dry and waterproof skin of reptiles, birds and mammals keeps invading microorganisms from entering the body. Human skin also secretes sebum, which is toxic to most microorganisms. On the other hand, larger parasites such as trematodes detect chemicals produced by the skin to locate their hosts when they enter the water. Vertebrate saliva and tears contain lysozyme, an enzyme that breaks down the cell walls of invading bacteria. Should the organism pass the mouth, the stomach with its hydrochloric acid, toxic to most microorganisms, is the next line of defence. Some intestinal parasites have a thick, tough outer coating which is digested slowly or not at all, allowing the parasite to pass through the stomach alive, at which point they enter the intestine and begin the next stage of their life. Once inside the body, parasites must overcome the immune system's serum proteins and pattern recognition receptors, intracellular and cellular, that trigger the adaptive immune system's lymphocytes such as T cells and antibody-producing B cells. These have receptors that recognise parasites.

==== Insects ====
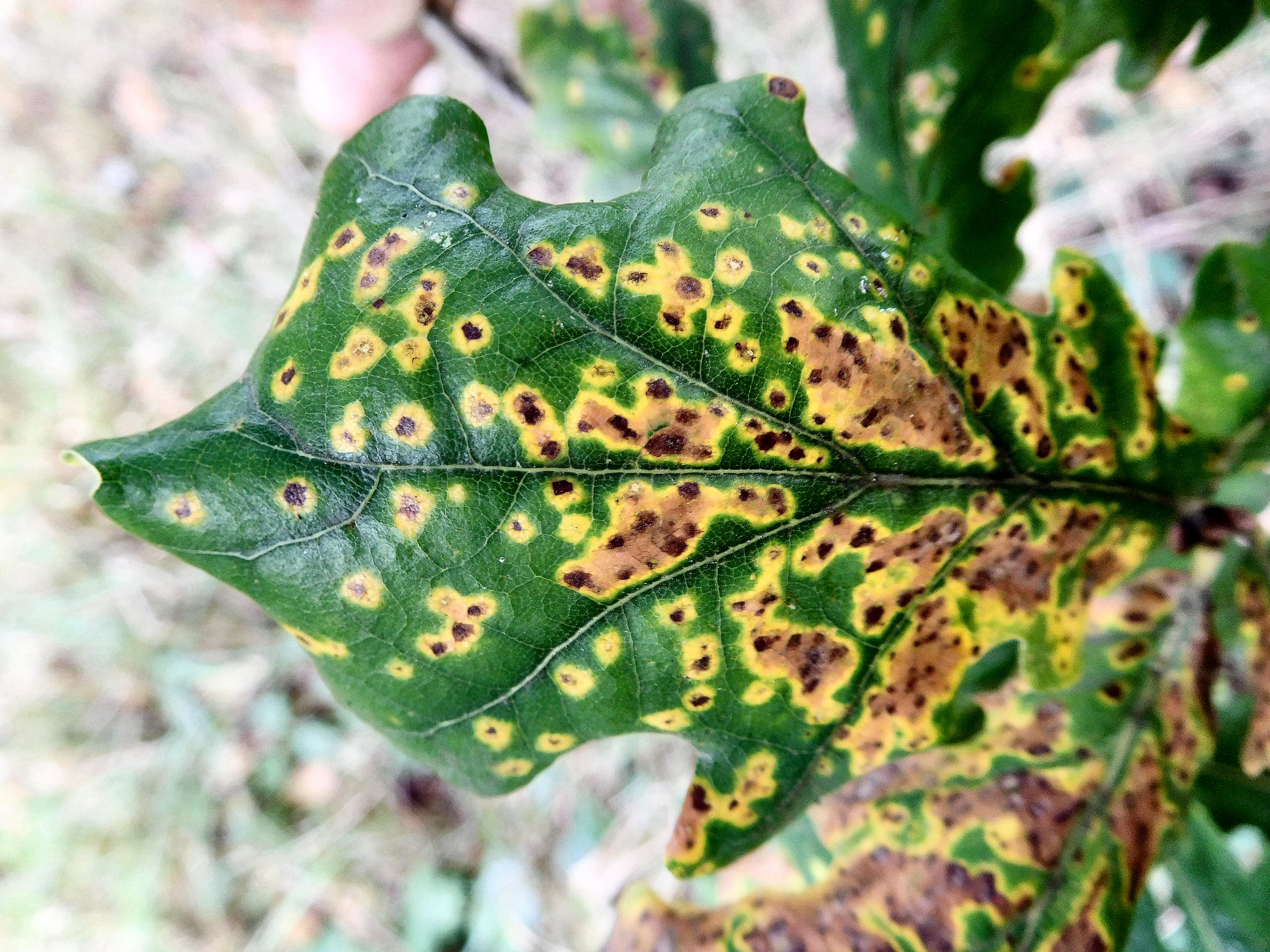
Leaf spot on oak. The spread of the parasitic fungus is limited by defensive chemicals produced by the tree, resulting in circular patches of damaged tissue.

Insects often adapt their nests to reduce parasitism. For example, one of the key reasons why the wasp Polistes canadensis nests across multiple combs, rather than building a single comb like much of the rest of its genus, is to avoid infestation by tineid moths. The tineid moth lays its eggs within the wasps' nests and then these eggs hatch into larvae that can burrow from cell to cell and prey on wasp pupae. Adult wasps attempt to remove and kill moth eggs and larvae by chewing down the edges of cells, coating the cells with an oral secretion that gives the nest a dark brownish appearance.

==== Plants ====
Plants respond to parasite attack with a series of chemical defences, such as polyphenol oxidase, under the control of the jasmonic acid-insensitive (JA) and salicylic acid (SA) signalling pathways. The different biochemical pathways are activated by different attacks, and the two pathways can interact positively or negatively. In general, plants can either initiate a specific or a non-specific response. Specific responses involve recognition of a parasite by the plant's cellular receptors, leading to a strong but localised response: defensive chemicals are produced around the area where the parasite was detected, blocking its spread, and avoiding wasting defensive production where it is not needed. Non-specific defensive responses are systemic, meaning that the responses are not confined to an area of the plant, but spread throughout the plant, making them costly in energy. These are effective against a wide range of parasites. When damaged, such as by lepidopteran caterpillars, leaves of plants including maize and cotton release increased amounts of volatile chemicals such as terpenes that signal they are being attacked; one effect of this is to attract parasitoid wasps, which in turn attack the caterpillars.

== Biology and conservation ==
=== Ecology and parasitology ===
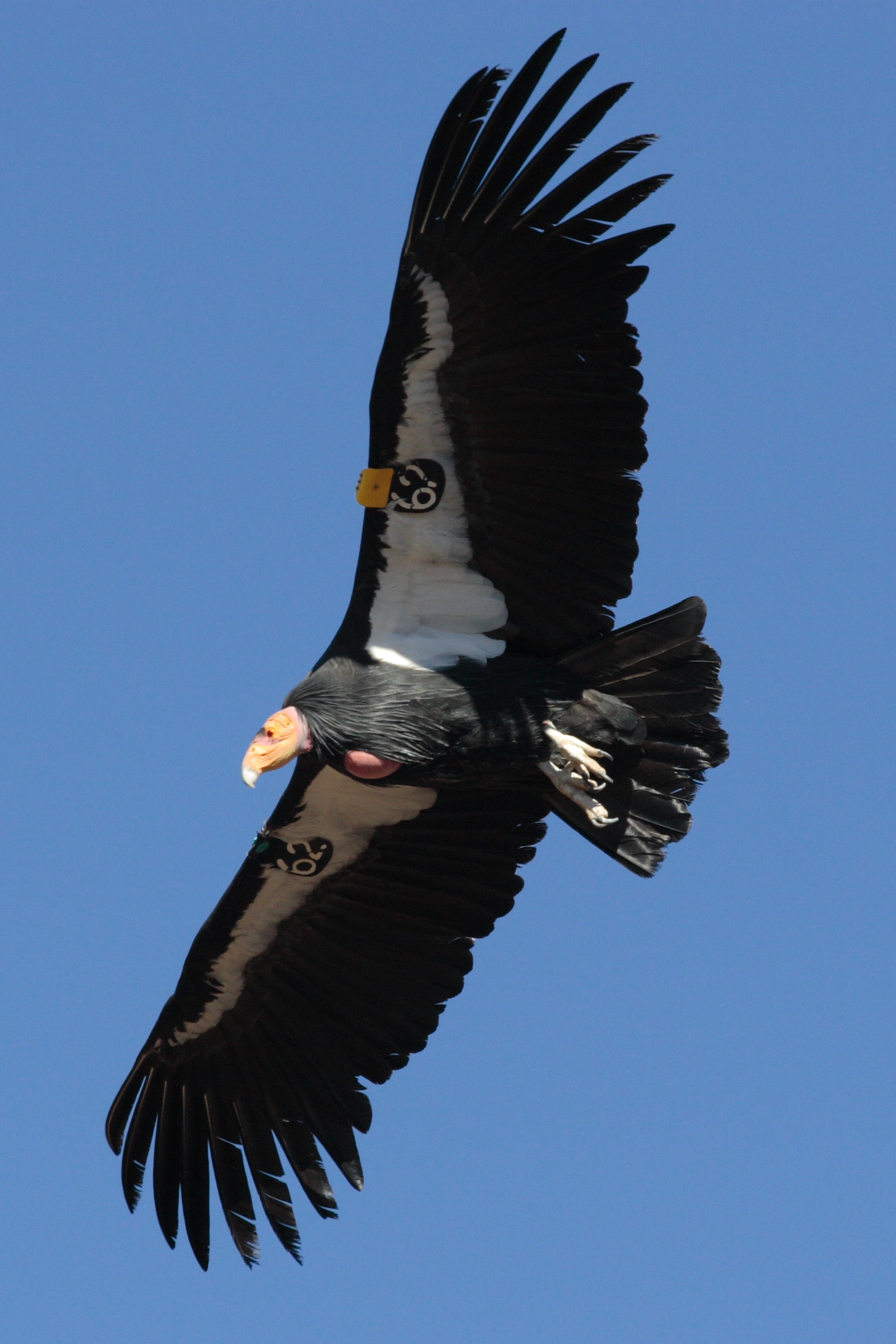
The rescuing from extinction of the California condor was a successful and expensive project, but its ectoparasite, the louse Colpocephalum californici, was made extinct.

Parasitism and parasite evolution were until the twenty-first century studied by parasitologists, in a science dominated by medicine, rather than by ecologists or evolutionary biologists. Even though parasite-host interactions were plainly ecological and important in evolution, the history of parasitology caused what the evolutionary ecologist Robert Poulin called a "takeover of parasitism by parasitologists", leading ecologists to ignore the area. This was in his opinion "unfortunate", as parasites are "omnipresent agents of natural selection" and significant forces in evolution and ecology. In his view, the long-standing split between the sciences limited the exchange of ideas, with separate conferences and separate journals. The technical languages of ecology and parasitology sometimes involved different meanings for the same words. There were philosophical differences, too: Poulin notes that, influenced by medicine, "many parasitologists accepted that evolution led to a decrease in parasite virulence, whereas modern evolutionary theory would have predicted a greater range of outcomes".

Their complex relationships make parasites difficult to place in food webs: a trematode with multiple hosts for its various life cycle stages would occupy many positions in a food web simultaneously, and would set up loops of energy flow, confusing the analysis. Further, since nearly every animal has (multiple) parasites, parasites would occupy the top levels of every food web.

Parasites can play a role in the proliferation of non-native species. For example, invasive green crabs are minimally affected by native trematodes on the Eastern Atlantic coast. This helps them outcompete native crabs such as the Atlantic Rock and Jonah crabs.

Ecological parasitology can be important to attempts at control, like during the campaign for eradicating the Guinea worm. Even though the parasite was eradicated in all but four countries, the worm began using frogs as an intermediary host before infecting dogs, making control more difficult than it would have been if the relationships had been better understood.

=== Rationale for conservation ===
External videos
- "Why you should care about parasites", 14 December 2018, Knowable Magazine

Although parasites are widely considered to be harmful, the eradication of all parasites would not be beneficial. Parasites account for at least half of life's diversity; they perform important ecological roles; and without parasites, organisms might tend to asexual reproduction, diminishing the diversity of traits brought about by sexual reproduction. Parasites provide an opportunity for the transfer of genetic material between species, facilitating evolutionary change. Many parasites require multiple hosts of different species to complete their life cycles and rely on predator-prey or other stable ecological interactions to get from one host to another. The presence of parasites thus indicates that an ecosystem is healthy.

An ectoparasite, the California condor louse, Colpocephalum californici, became a well-known conservation issue. A large and costly captive breeding program was run in the United States to rescue the California condor. It was host to a louse, which lived only on it. Any lice found were "deliberately killed" during the program, to keep the condors in the best possible health. The result was that one species, the condor, was saved and returned to the wild, while another species, the parasite, became extinct.

Although parasites are often omitted in depictions of food webs, they usually occupy the top position. Parasites can function like keystone species, reducing the dominance of superior competitors and allowing competing species to co-exist.

Parasites are distributed unevenly among their hosts, most hosts having no parasites, and a few hosts harbouring most of the parasite population. This distribution makes sampling difficult and requires careful use of statistics.

=== Quantitative ecology ===
A single parasite species usually has an aggregated distribution across host animals, which means that most hosts carry few parasites, while a few hosts carry the vast majority of parasite individuals. This poses considerable problems for students of parasite ecology, as it renders parametric statistics as commonly used by biologists invalid. Log-transformation of data before the application of parametric test, or the use of non-parametric statistics is recommended by several authors, but this can give rise to further problems, so quantitative parasitology is based on more advanced biostatistical methods.

== History ==
=== Ancient ===
Human parasites including roundworms, the Guinea worm, threadworms and tapeworms are mentioned in Egyptian papyrus records from 3000 BC onwards; the Ebers Papyrus describes hookworm. In ancient Greece, parasites including the bladder worm are described in the Hippocratic Corpus, while the comic playwright Aristophanes called tapeworms "hailstones". The Roman physicians Celsus and Galen documented the roundworms Ascaris lumbricoides and Enterobius vermicularis.

=== Medieval ===
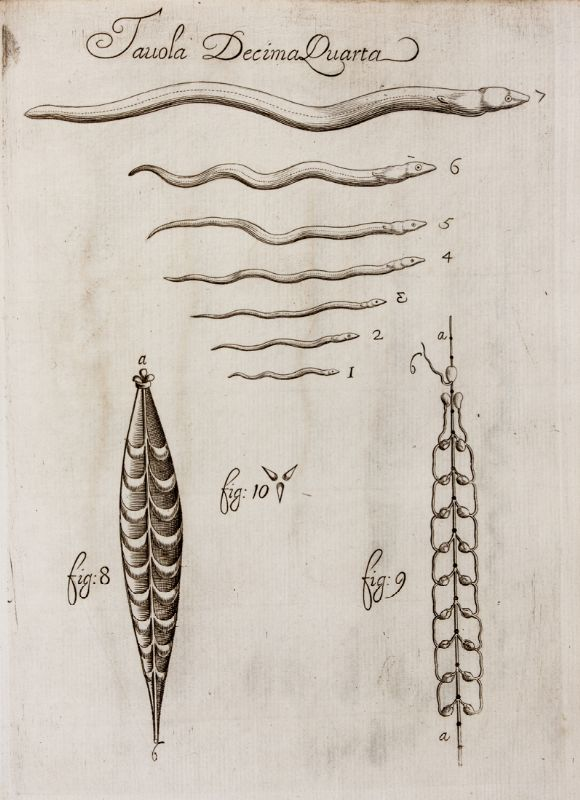
A plate from Francesco Redi's Osservazioni intorno agli animali viventi che si trovano negli animali viventi (Observations on living animals found inside living animals), 1684

In his Canon of Medicine, completed in 1025, the Persian physician Avicenna recorded human and animal parasites including roundworms, threadworms, the Guinea worm and tapeworms.

In his 1397 book Traité de l'état, science et pratique de l'art de la Bergerie (Account of the state, science and practice of the art of shepherding), Jehan de Brie wrote the first description of a trematode endoparasite, the sheep liver fluke Fasciola hepatica.

=== Early modern ===
In the early modern period, Francesco Redi's 1668 book Esperienze Intorno alla Generazione degl'Insetti (Experiences of the Generation of Insects), explicitly described ecto- and endoparasites, illustrating ticks, the larvae of nasal flies of deer, and sheep liver fluke. Redi noted that parasites develop from eggs, contradicting the theory of spontaneous generation. In his 1684 book Osservazioni intorno agli animali viventi che si trovano negli animali viventi (Observations on Living Animals found in Living Animals), Redi described and illustrated over 100 parasites including the large roundworm in humans that causes ascariasis. Redi was the first to name the cysts of Echinococcus granulosus seen in dogs and sheep as parasitic; a century later, in 1760, Peter Simon Pallas correctly suggested that these were the larvae of tapeworms.

In 1681, Antonie van Leeuwenhoek observed and illustrated the protozoan parasite Giardia lamblia, and linked it to "his own loose stools". This was the first protozoan parasite of humans to be seen under a microscope. A few years later, in 1687, the Italian biologists Giovanni Cosimo Bonomo and Diacinto Cestoni described scabies as caused by the parasitic mite Sarcoptes scabiei, marking it as the first disease of humans with a known microscopic causative agent.

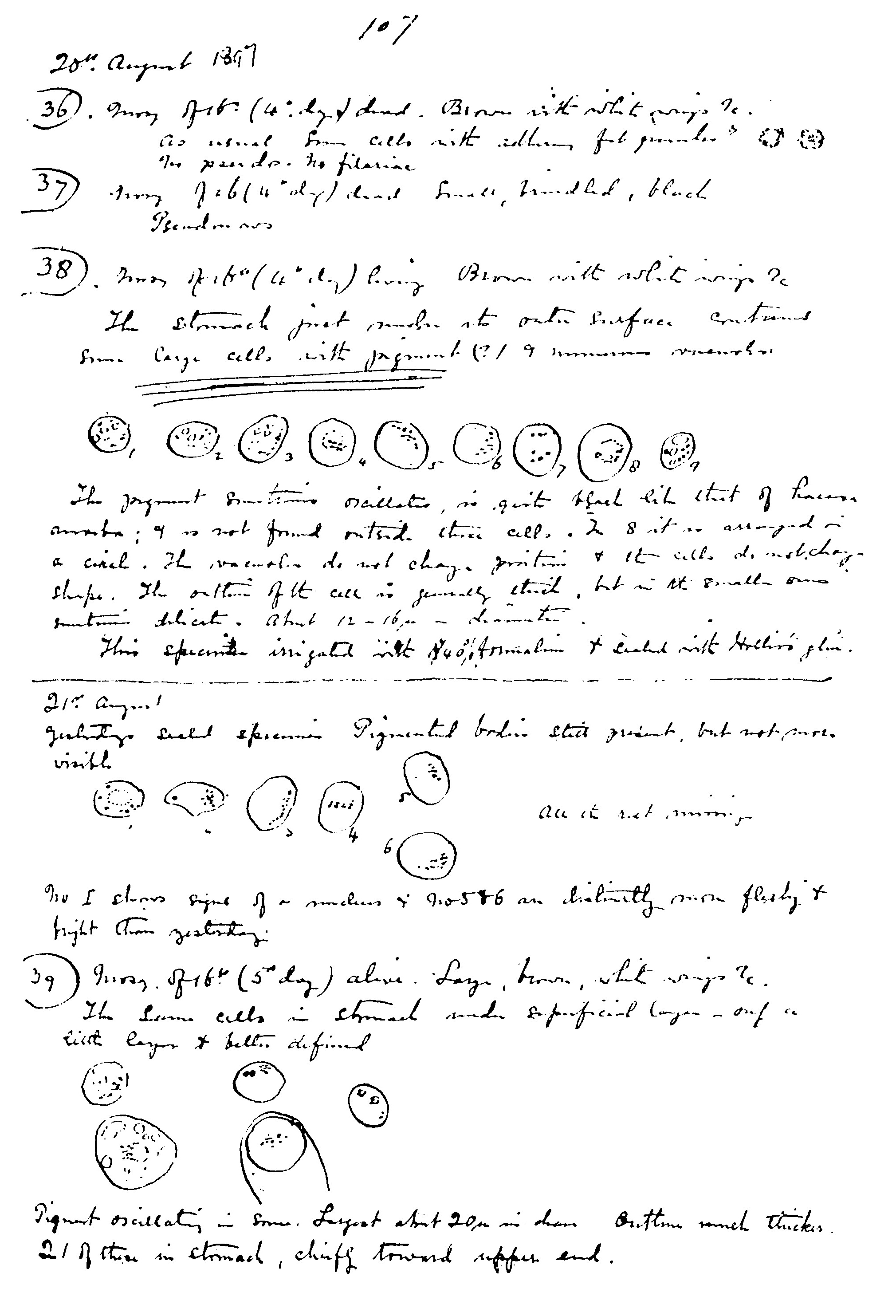
Ronald Ross won the 1902 Nobel Prize for showing that the malaria parasite is transmitted by mosquitoes. This 1897 notebook page records his first observations of the parasite in mosquitoes.

=== Parasitology ===
Modern parasitology developed in the 19th century with accurate observations and experiments by many researchers and clinicians; the term was first used in 1870. In 1828, James Annersley described amoebiasis, protozoal infections of the intestines and the liver, though the pathogen, Entamoeba histolytica, was not discovered until 1873 by Friedrich Lösch. James Paget discovered the intestinal nematode Trichinella spiralis in humans in 1835. James McConnell described the human liver fluke, Clonorchis sinensis, in 1875. Algernon Thomas and Rudolf Leuckart independently made the first discovery of the life cycle of a trematode, the sheep liver fluke, by experiment in 1881–1883. In 1877 Patrick Manson discovered the life cycle of the filarial worms that cause elephantiasis transmitted by mosquitoes. Manson further predicted that the malaria parasite, Plasmodium, had a mosquito vector, and persuaded Ronald Ross to investigate. Ross confirmed that the prediction was correct in 1897–1898. At the same time, Giovanni Battista Grassi and others described the malaria parasite's life cycle stages in Anopheles mosquitoes. Ross was controversially awarded the 1902 Nobel prize for his work, while Grassi was not. In 1903, David Bruce identified the protozoan parasite and the tsetse fly vector of African trypanosomiasis.

=== Vaccine ===
Given the importance of malaria, with some 220 million people infected annually, many attempts have been made to interrupt its transmission. Various methods of malaria prophylaxis have been tried including the use of antimalarial drugs to kill off the parasites in the blood, the eradication of its mosquito vectors with organochlorine and other insecticides, and the development of a malaria vaccine. All of these have proven problematic, with drug resistance, insecticide resistance among mosquitoes, and repeated failure of vaccines as the parasite mutates. The first and as of 2015 the only licensed vaccine for any parasitic disease of humans is RTS,S for Plasmodium falciparum malaria.

=== Biological control ===
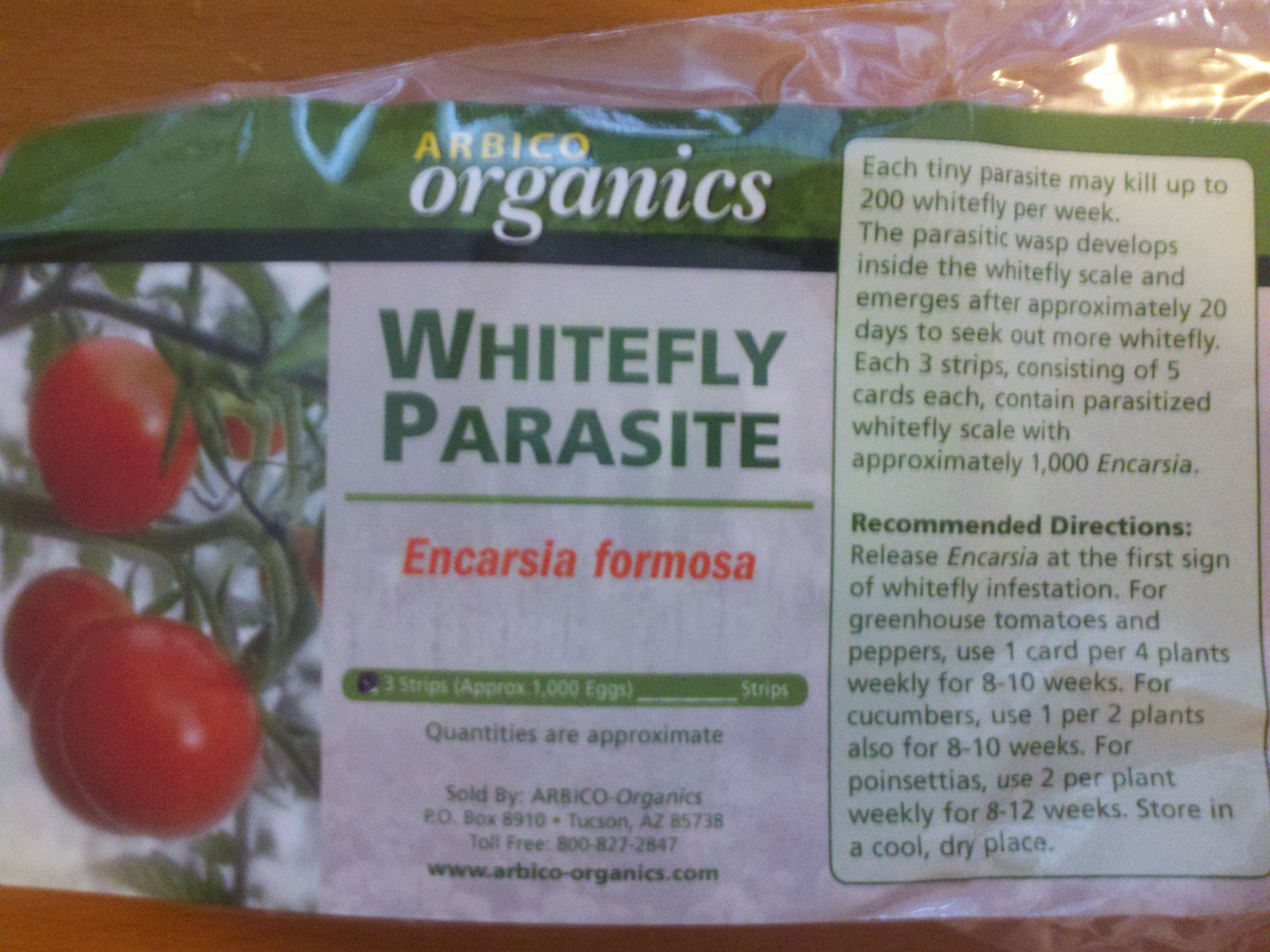
Encarsia formosa, widely used in greenhouse horticulture, was one of the first biological control agents developed.

Several groups of parasites, including microbial pathogens and parasitoidal wasps have been used as biological control agents in agriculture and horticulture.

=== Resistance ===
Poulin observes that the widespread prophylactic use of anthelmintic drugs in domestic sheep and cattle constitutes a worldwide uncontrolled experiment in the life-history evolution of their parasites. The outcomes depend on whether the drugs decrease the chance of a helminth larva reaching adulthood. If so, natural selection can be expected to favour the production of eggs at an earlier age. If on the other hand the drugs mainly affects adult parasitic worms, selection could cause delayed maturity and increased virulence. Such changes appear to be underway: the nematode Teladorsagia circumcincta is changing its adult size and reproductive rate in response to drugs.

== Cultural significance ==
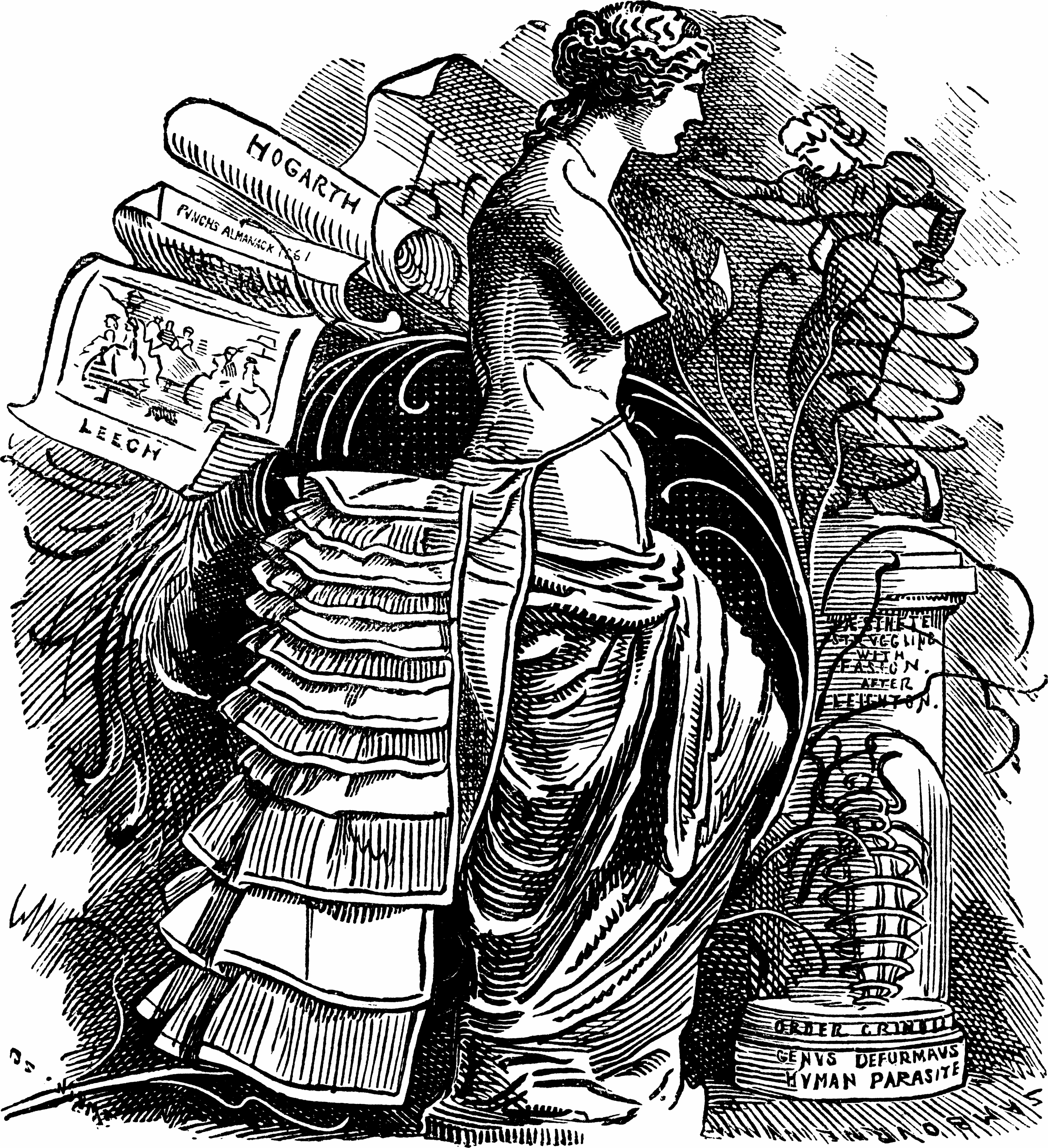
"An Old Parasite in a New Form": an 1881 Punch cartoon by Edward Linley Sambourne compares a crinoletta bustle to a parasitic insect's exoskeleton

=== Classical times ===
In the classical era, the concept of the parasite was not strictly pejorative: the parasitus was an accepted role in Roman society, in which a person could live off the hospitality of others, in return for "flattery, simple services, and a willingness to endure humiliation".

=== Society ===
Parasitism has a derogatory sense in popular usage. According to the immunologist John Playfair,

In everyday speech, the term 'parasite' is loaded with derogatory meaning. A parasite is a sponger, a lazy profiteer, a drain on society.

The satirical cleric Jonathan Swift alludes to hyperparasitism in his 1733 poem "On Poetry: A Rhapsody", comparing poets to "vermin" who "teaze and pinch their foes":

The vermin only teaze and pinch
Their foes superior by an inch.
So nat'ralists observe, a flea
Hath smaller fleas that on him prey;

And these have smaller fleas to bite 'em.
And so proceeds ad infinitum.
Thus every poet, in his kind,
Is bit by him that comes behind:

A 2022 study examined the naming of some 3000 parasite species discovered in the previous two decades. Of those named after scientists, over 80% were named for men, whereas about a third of authors of papers on parasites were women. The study found that the percentage of parasite species named for relatives or friends of the author has risen sharply in the same period.

=== Fiction ===
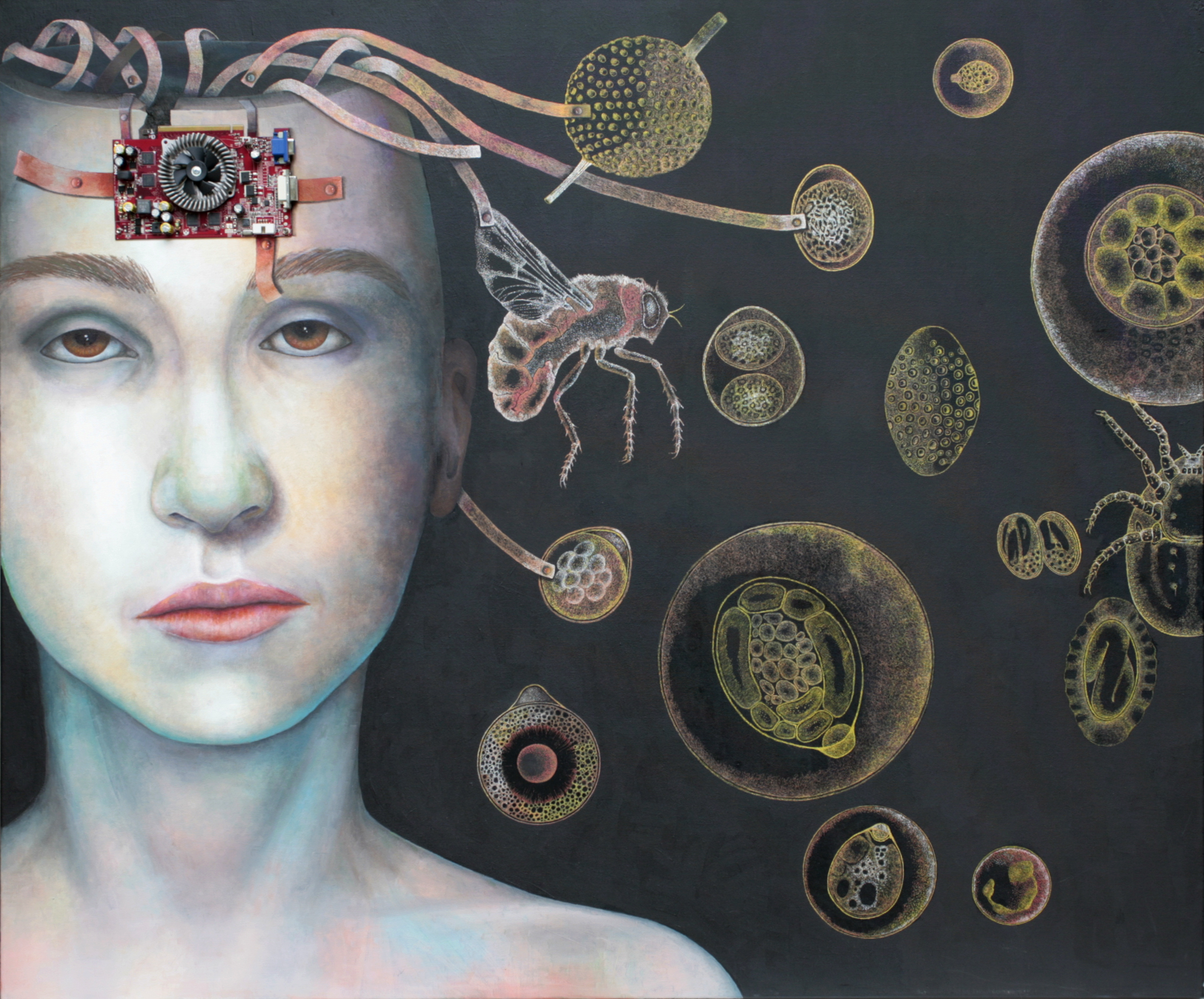
Fictional parasitism: oil painting Parasites by Katrin Alvarez, 2011

In Bram Stoker's 1897 Gothic horror novel Dracula, and its many film adaptations, the eponymous Count Dracula is a blood-drinking parasite (a vampire). The critic Laura Otis argues that as a "thief, seducer, creator, and mimic, Dracula is the ultimate parasite. The whole point of vampirism is sucking other people's blood—living at other people's expense."

Disgusting and terrifying parasitic alien species are widespread in science fiction, as for instance in Ridley Scott's 1979 film Alien. In one scene, a Xenomorph bursts out of the chest of a man, with blood squirting out under high pressure assisted by explosive squibs. Animal organs were used to reinforce the shock effect. The scene was filmed in a single take, and the startled reactions of the actors were genuine.

The entomopathogenic fungus Cordyceps is represented culturally as a deadly threat to the human race. The video game series The Last of Us (2013–present) and its television adaptation present Cordyceps as a parasite of humans, causing a zombie apocalypse. Its human hosts initially become violent "infected" beings, before turning into blind zombie "clickers", complete with fruiting bodies growing out from their faces.

== See also ==
- Antiparasitic
- Carcinogenic parasite
- Effects of parasitic worms on the immune system
- List of parasites of humans

== Sources ==
- Poulin, Robert (2007). Evolutionary Ecology of Parasites. Princeton University Press. ISBN 978-0-691-12085-0.
