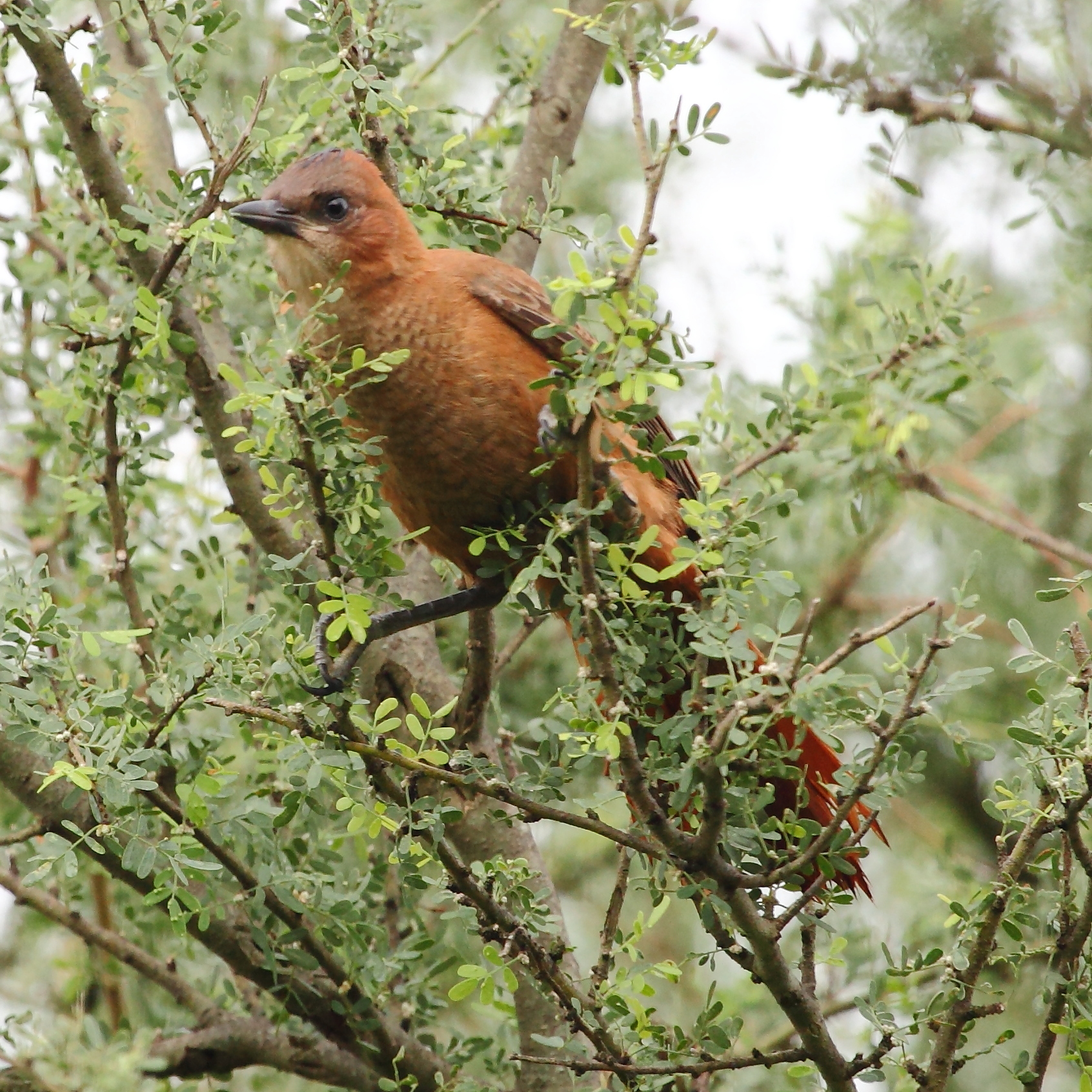
- At Santa Fe Province, Argentina

Conservation status
- Least Concern (IUCN 3.1)

Scientific classification
- Kingdom: Animalia
- Phylum: Chordata
- Class: Aves
- Order: Passeriformes
- Family: Furnariidae
- Genus: Pseudoseisura
- Species: P. lophotes

Binomial name
- Pseudoseisura lophotes (Reichenbach, 1853)

Subspecies
- P. l. lophotes Reichenbach, 1853; P. l. argentina Parkes, 1960
- Year-round

Synonyms
- Homorus lophotes (Reichenbach, 1853)

= Brown cacholote =

Bird species

The brown cacholote (Pseudoseisura lophotes) is a medium-sized bird of the ovenbird family Furnariidae. It was described by Ludwig Reichenbach in 1853, with its subspecies, argentina, described in 1960 by Kenneth Carroll Parkes. It is nonmigratory, and is found in the forests and parks of Argentina, Bolivia, Brazil, Paraguay, and Uruguay. Unlike many other birds, the brown cacholote builds large, pitcher-like nests year-round, each weighing many times more than the bird itself. Breeding begins in mid-November, with both parents sharing the responsibility for taking care of the nest equally. Incubation takes 17–20 days, and nestlings fledge at 19 days. They are omnivorous, primarily eating various arthropods, along with the eggs of other birds, fruits, and grain. The causes of death in adults is not well researched; however, nestlings are subject to parasitism from various insects. Egg success rate is 59%. They are a least-concern species.

== Taxonomy and systematics ==
The brown cacholote was first described as Homorus lophotes by Ludwig Reichenbach in 1853 in his book Handbuch der speciellen Ornithologie. It was later moved into the genus Pseudoseisura by Miguel Lillo in 1902. The specific epithet, lophotes, derives from the Greek word lophōtos, meaning "crested".

- P. l. lophotes Reichenbach, 1853—Nominate subspecies.
- P. l. argentina Parkes, 1960—Darker in plumage compared to nominate, with especially dark crest. Found in northern and central Argentina, Uruguay, and southern Brazil.

Derryberry et al.'s 2011 study described a phylogram for Pseudoseisura, along with the rest of the Furnariidae.

- Pseudoseisura
  - - Brown cacholote (P. lophotes)
    - White-throated cacholote (P. gutturalis)
  - - Caatinga cacholote (P. cristata)
    - Grey-crested cacholote (P. unirufa)

Before 2024, the brown cacholote's taxonomy was previously unsettled, as the International Ornithological Committee and BirdLife International's Handbook of the Birds of the World assign it two subspecies, the nominate P. l. lophotes and P. l. argentina, but the Clements Checklist did not recognize P. l. argentina, treating the brown cacholote as monotypic. In 2024, it was recognized as a subspecies.

== Description ==
The brown cacholote ranges from 24 to 26 cm (9.4 to 10 in) in length and weighs 63 to 79 g (2.2 to 2.8 oz), making it one of the largest furnariids. The entire bird is rufous, with varying shades in different areas. The area between the eye and nostrils is slightly darker, alongside the bottom of the tail feathers. The breast is lighter in color compared to the throat, which is especially vibrant. The feathers on the top of the head (the crest) resembles that of a jay and is especially dark, along with the primary and secondary flight feathers. The iris is yellow, the bill is black, and the legs are grayish-olive to dull greenish, with nestlings having more monotone feet, greener irises, and greyer bill, with yellow gape flanges. Both sexes have the same plumage, and males are slightly larger. Wings are 123 or 128.7 mm (4.84 or 5.07 in), tails are 109.4 or 111.5 mm (4.31 or 4.39 in), and bills are 26.4 or 27 mm (1.04 or 1.06 in) in length, for males and females respectively. They are very distinct in their habitat, and are easily identifiable.

The brown cacholote performs its songs in a duet, usually on the tops of trees with fanned tails and spread wings. Songs are composed of variably noisy and coarse notes, fading toward the end. Songs can last at least 25 seconds, with around 2 notes per second. Its call is a loud "krok" or "cluck".

== Distribution and habitat ==
The brown cacholote can be found in the more humid regions of the Gran Chaco and Argentine Espinal north of Rio Colorado; however, its subspecies are allopatric and occupy their own range. The nominate subspecies of the brown cacholote is found in southern Bolivia and western Paraguay, and subspecies P. l. argentina is found in northern and central Argentina, far southern Brazil, and Uruguay; however, vagrants have been spotted as south as Chubut Province.

The species inhabits tropical deciduous forest, the edges of gallery forest, chaco woodlands and scrublands, as well as parks and gardens in urban areas. In elevation it ranges from near sea level to 900 m (3,000 ft). The brown cacholote is a year-round resident throughout its range.

== Behavior ==
The brown cacholote is monogamous, meaning it remains mated to the same partner for life. If a partner dies, a new one is found promptly.

=== Breeding ===
Male brown cacholotes court nearly exclusively inside or near the nest. Once both the male and the female are close enough to the nest, both begin repeatedly singing in a duet. The male brings its body horizontal to the ground, sags his wings low, and fans his tail feathers while chittering. The male then enters the nest and the female follows, spinning around 2–3 times, before pausing for 15 seconds. The female then lowers her feathers, and they copulate. After copulating, the pair sing a duet inside the nest.

Nest-building occurs year-round, although nests are more frequently built in the winter months (July–October). Nests usually took 15–37 days to build, with 62 days between new nests on average. Nests are used for both roosting and breeding; however, each nest is only used for 42 days. New nests are always built from scratch, and old nests are never reused, perhaps because of concern for parasites. Old nests are often destroyed or reused as materials for new nests, or destroyed with the foundation intact for reuse in a later nest. Sometimes a pair immediately start building a new nest after they finished their previous one. Nests are usually built in the pair's territory, which, on average, is 2–3 ha (4.9–7.4 acres) in size, and contained around 4.4 nests.

Nests are most often found on solitary trees or on the edges of cleared woodlands, around 2–17 m (6.6–55.8 ft) off the ground. The brown cacholote's nest is very unique, consisting of a large, oval chamber, around 22 cm (8.7 in) in interior diameter, and a slightly down-curved entrance, 9–10 cm (3.5–3.9 in) in inner diameter and 30 cm (12 in) in length, with the entire nest around 90 cm (35 in) in length, with the entire structure weighing 2–5 kg (4.4–11.0 lb), many times more than the bird itself. Nests are made of thorny twigs, or if unavailable, regular sticks. Twigs measured on average 15.6 cm (6.1 in) in length, and 5 mm (0.20 in) in diameter.

Eggs are 20.8 and 27.1 mm (0.82 and 1.07 in) in length and diameter, respectively, weighing on average 7.6 g (0.27 oz). Eggs are often stained with blood.

Egg-laying usually begins in mid-November, although it can occur as early as late September or as late as mid-January. If eggs are preyed upon, a new nest is built and a replacement clutch is laid. Second broods, similar to replacement clutches, accompany a new nest, and usually occur around 70–100 days after the first clutch, although they are very rare(5.7%). Clutches consist of 2–3 eggs, and older pairs have, on average, larger clutches. Incubation takes 18–20 days, and eggs are attended to by both parents during the day; however, at night, only the female remains in the nest. Sessions between the male and females are shared equally during the day, each taking on average 28 minutes, usually only exchanging roles when the other had arrived at the nest.

Both sexes spend equal time and energy caring for the newly hatched nestlings, each bringing on average 11 food items per hour; however, during the last week before the nestlings fledged, the frequency increases to an average 19 items/h. Both parents shared the duty of removing eggshells and fecal sacs. After fledging (learning how to fly), which usually occurs 19 days after hatching, the parents continue to bring food to them for 20 more days, reducing the amount as time progresses. At birth, nestlings have pale yellow flanges, grey plumule, and weigh around 5.7 g (0.20 oz), however, by day 17, nestlings are fully feathered and weigh around 80 g (2.8 oz). Fledglings remain on the parent's territory for 5–13 months, with females remaining on average 6 months longer. Fledglings are not allowed to help with nest construction and are often chased from the nest by the parents if they try. After departure, fledglings move away from the parent's territory or leave entirely.

Nests are occasionally parasitized by the shiny cowbird but their eggs are removed by adult cacholotes.

=== Feeding ===
The brown cacholote is omnivorous, having one of the largest diets of any ovenbird. It feeds primarily on arthropods like beetles, centipedes, spiders, or ants, as well as the eggs of other birds, usually the domestic chicken. Additional items in its diet include tree sap, various seeds, snails, various small amphibians, and fruit. They are the most common consumer of any ovenbird of the blue passionflower. It usually forages in pairs or with other brown cacholotes. It feeds mostly on the ground, gleaning, probing, and digging in soil and leaf litter. It has also been observed flaking dung and hammering and pulling on bark and leaf buds.

=== Survival ===
Little is known about the causes of mortality in adults; however, nestlings are subject to parasitism from botflies, Psitticimex uritui, Philornis, and various mites and Cimicidae, as well as brood parasitism from the shiny cowbird. Adult botflies, which account for 5.5% of nestling deaths, place their eggs on the skin of nestlings, preferring those younger than a week, and the larvae would burrow into the nestling's skin to feed on its body fluids. Monk parakeets, which often use abandoned brown cacholote nests for rest, may also deposit P. uritui. The brown cacholote usually begin breeding at 2 years old. Eggs have a 59% success rate.

== Conservation ==
BirdLife International has assessed the brown cacholote as being of least concern. It has large range and an unknown population size that is believed to be decreasing. No immediate threats have been identified. It is considered uncommon to fairly common by BirdLife, and occurs in several protected areas, and is somewhat tolerant of habitat disruption; found living in fragmented woodlands as small as 1.5 hectares (3.7 acres).
