= Bat bug =

Parasitic insects that feed on bat blood

Bat bugs are parasitic blood-sucking insects that feed primarily on the blood of bats – their hosts. The name has been applied to members of the family Cimicidae (e.g. Cimex lectularius, Afrocimex constrictus) and also to members of the family Polyctenidae. Bat bugs are closely related to bed bugs, and are so similar in appearance that they are often mistaken for bed bugs. Microscopic examination is needed to distinguish them. Bat bugs will also bite humans if given the opportunity. Bat bug species include:

- African bat bug (Afrocimex constrictus)
- Eastern bat bug (Cimex adjunctus)

== Anatomy ==
A key physiological distinction between the common bedbug and the bat bug is the fringe hairs on the pronotum (the upper covering of the thorax), which are at least as long as the width of the bat bug's eye, but shorter in the bedbug.

== Infestations ==
Bat bugs are moderately common in the midwest US and have been recorded in Scotland, and are found in houses and buildings that harbor bats. Infestations in human dwellings are usually introduced by bats carrying the bugs on their skin. Bat bugs usually remain close to the roosting locations of bats (attics, chimneys, etc.) but explore the rest of the building if the bats leave or are eliminated. In some cases, they move into harborages that are more typical of bedbugs, such as mattresses and bed frames.

== Life cycle ==
Development from egg to adult ranges from 2 weeks in ideal conditions (warm temperature and abundant food supply) to more than 15 weeks, averaging about 1.5 months. An adult may survive more than one year without feeding. As with the common bed bug, a nymph requires a blood meal to molt, and an adult female requires a blood meal to lay eggs.

== Feeding habits ==
Bat bugs feed on blood from bats, but when they wander away from the bat roost area, they will feed on other warm-blooded animals, including people. This feeding is an annoyance but is not dangerous. Bat bugs have not been found to transmit any diseases.
