= Bed bug (disambiguation) =

Bed bugs are blood feeding insects that may infest human dwellings

Bed bug or bed bugs may also refer to:

== Taxa ==
- Cimex, a genus of small nocturnal insect of which members cause bed bug infestations
  - Cimex lectularius, the most common species of bed bug in temperate regions
  - Cimex hemipterus, a tropical species

== Culture ==
- Bedbugs (album), a 1993 album by the band Odds
- The Bedbug, play by Vladimir Mayakovsky
- "Bedbugging", an mid-2020s internet trend

== Place ==
- Ione, California, formerly called "Bedbug" and "Bed Bug"

Bed bug
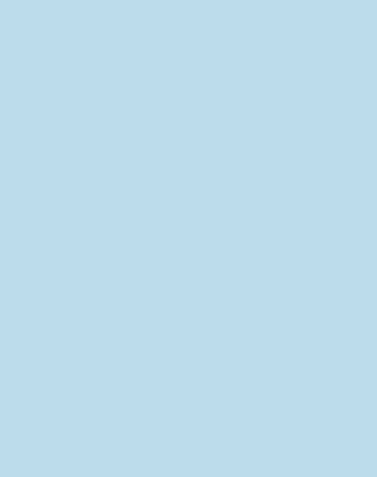
- An example of a picture that internet users engaging in the trend of "bedbugging" may use to cryptically wish another user good night, derived from the hexadecimal value for the color.
