= Carayon =

Carayon is a surname. Notable people with the surname include:

- Auguste Carayon (1813–1874), French Roman Catholic writer
- Bernard Carayon (born 1957), French politician
- Christophe Carayon, French paralympic athlete
- Jacques Carayon (1916–1997), French entomologist
- Pascale Carayon, French-American industrial engineer
