= Haematosiphoninae =

Scientific classification
- Kingdom: Animalia
- Phylum: Arthropoda
- Clade: Pancrustacea
- Class: Insecta
- Order: Hemiptera
- Suborder: Heteroptera
- Family: Cimicidae
- Subfamily: Haematosiphoninae; Jordan & Rothschild, 1912

Subfamily of insects

Haematosiphoninae is a blood-sucking parasitoid subfamily of Cimicidae, first formally described in 1912 by Jordan & Rothschild.

Haematosiphoninae contains the following genera:

- Cimexopsis
- Ornithocoris
- Haematosiphon
- Hesperocimex
- Psitticimex
