= Hesperocimex coloradensis =

Scientific classification
- Domain: Eukaryota
- Kingdom: Animalia
- Phylum: Arthropoda
- Class: Insecta
- Order: Hemiptera
- Suborder: Heteroptera
- Family: Cimicidae
- Genus: Hesperocimex
- Species: H. coloradensis

Binomial name
- Hesperocimex coloradensis List, 1925

Species of true bug

Hesperocimex coloradensis, the Colorado bed bug, is a species of bed bug in the family Cimicidae. It is found in Central America and North America.
