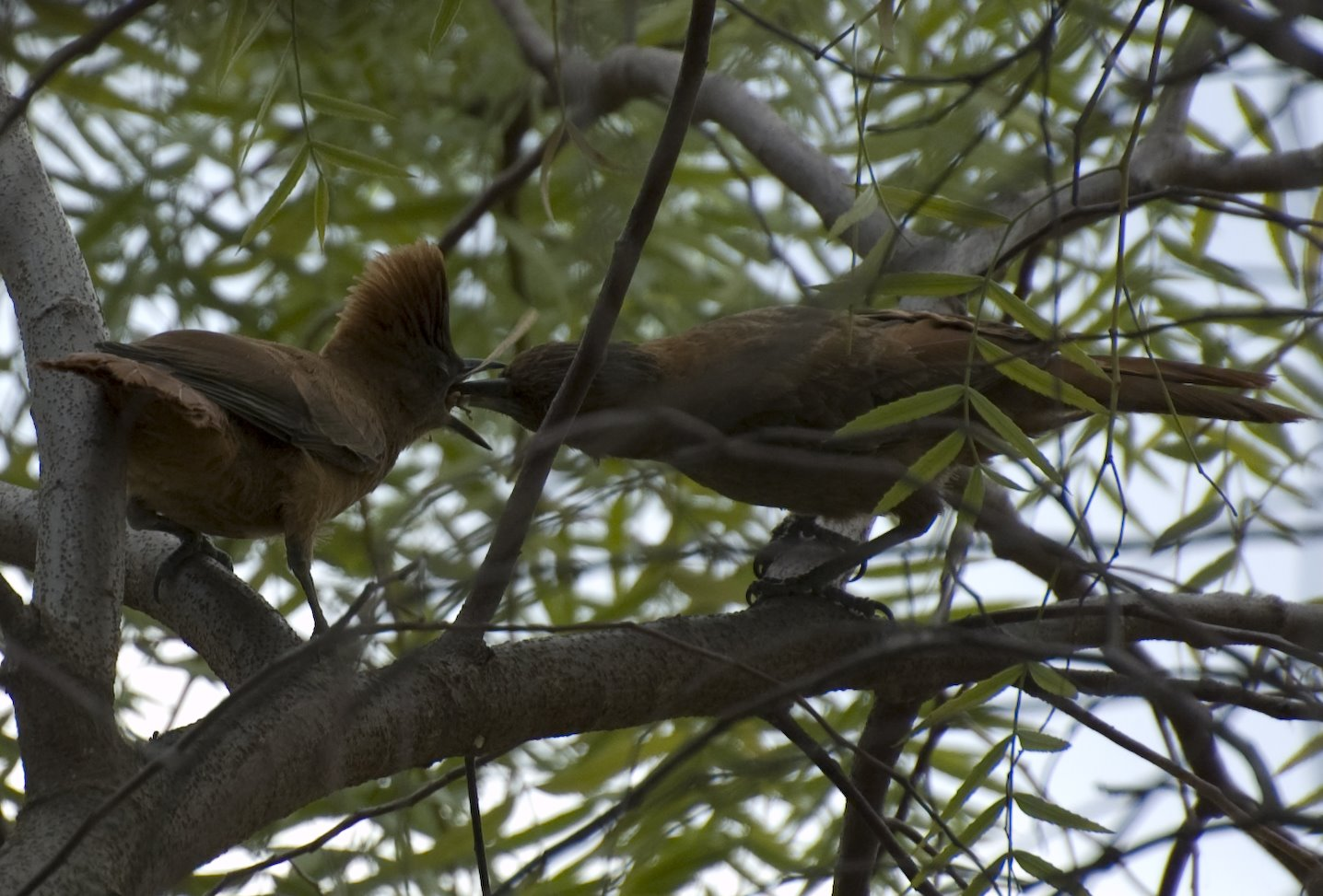
- Brown cacholote (Pseudoseisura lophotes)

Scientific classification
- Kingdom: Animalia
- Phylum: Chordata
- Class: Aves
- Order: Passeriformes
- Family: Furnariidae
- Genus: Pseudoseisura; Reichenbach, 1853

Type species
- Anabates gutturalis White-throated cacholote D'Orbigny & Lafresnaye, 1838

Species
- Pseudoseisura cristata Pseudoseisura gutturalis Pseudoseisura lophotes Pseudoseisura unirufa †Pseudoseisura cursor

= Cacholote =

Genus of birds

The cacholotes are four species of relatively large, heavy-billed furnariids in the genus Pseudoseisura. They are found in shrubby habitats in the South American countries of Brazil, Bolivia, Argentina, Paraguay and Uruguay. They are essentially brown (ranging from deep rufous to pale gray-brown depending on species), and all are crested to some extent.

== Taxonomy ==
The genus Pseudoseisura was introduced in 1853 by the German naturalist Ludwig Reichenbach to accommodate the white-throated cacholote. The name combines the Ancient Greek pseudos meaning "false" and seisoura, a bird mentioned by the Greek lexicologist Hesychius of Alexandria and believed to be a wagtail Motacilla.

=== Species ===
The genus contains four extant species:

Image	Scientific name	Common name	Distribution
	Pseudoseisura cristata	Caatinga cacholote	Caatinga in north-eastern Brazil.
	Pseudoseisura unirufa	Grey-crested cacholote	Pantanal-region in Brazil, Paraguay and Bolivia
	Pseudoseisura lophotes	Brown cacholote	northern Argentina, western Paraguay and Uruguay; also in southeastern Bolivia and Rio Grande do Sul
	Pseudoseisura gutturalis	White-throated cacholote	Argentina (Patagonia and the northwest).

The allopatric Caatinga and gray-crested cacholotes were formerly considered conspecific under the name rufous cacholote (Pseudoseisura cristata).

Fossil species:

- †Pseudoseisura cursor (Pleistocene of Argentina)
