= Bertilia (bug) =

Scientific classification
- Domain: Eukaryota
- Kingdom: Animalia
- Phylum: Arthropoda
- Class: Insecta
- Order: Hemiptera
- Suborder: Heteroptera
- Family: Cimicidae
- Genus: Bertilia; Reuter, 1913

Genus of insects

Bertilia is a genus of true bugs belonging to the family Cimicidae.

Species:

- Bertilia valdiviana (Philippi, 1865)
