= Hesperocimex =

Scientific classification
- Kingdom: Animalia
- Phylum: Arthropoda
- Clade: Pancrustacea
- Class: Insecta
- Order: Hemiptera
- Suborder: Heteroptera
- Family: Cimicidae
- Subfamily: Haematosiphoninae
- Genus: Hesperocimex; List, 1925

Genus of true bugs

Hesperocimex is a genus of bed bugs in the family Cimicidae. There are at least two described species in Hesperocimex.

== Species ==
These two species belong to the genus Hesperocimex:

- Hesperocimex coloradensis List, 1925 (Colorado bed bug)
- Hesperocimex sonorensis Ryckman, 1958
