= Oeciacus vicarius =

Scientific classification
- Kingdom: Animalia
- Phylum: Arthropoda
- Class: Insecta
- Order: Hemiptera
- Suborder: Heteroptera
- Family: Cimicidae
- Genus: Oeciacus
- Species: O. vicarius

Binomial name
- Oeciacus vicarius Horváth, 1912

Species of true bug

Oeciacus vicarius, known generally as the American swallow bug or cliff swallow bug, is a species of bed bug in the family Cimicidae. It is found in North America. The bug is a blood-feeding ectoparasite of the colonially nesting American cliff swallow (Petrochelidon pyrrhonota) and vector of Buggy Creek Virus (family Togaviridae, genus Alphavirus).
