= Afrocimex constrictus =

Scientific classification
- Kingdom: Animalia
- Phylum: Arthropoda
- Class: Insecta
- Order: Hemiptera
- Suborder: Heteroptera
- Family: Cimicidae
- Genus: Afrocimex
- Species: A. constrictus

Binomial name
- Afrocimex constrictus Ferris & Usinger, 1957

Species of true bug

Afrocimex constrictus, also called the African bat bug, is an insect parasite of Egyptian fruit bats in East African bat caves. Population sizes can comprise millions of individuals and in a cave there can be one to 15 bugs per bat. It was estimated that adult African bat bugs feed approximately once per week thus withdrawing 1-28 microlitre blood per day per bat.

As in many other cimicids, Afrocimex constrictus reproduce through traumatic insemination. During mating, the male pierces the female's abdomen with his genitals, and ejaculates into her body cavity, into a special organ called the spermalege. While females do have external genitalia, they are used for egg laying but not for mating. Afrocimex constrictus males also pierce and inseminate other males. Male-male stabbings were originally probably harmful to males and so it was speculated that male-male stabbings were the reason that Afrocimex constrictus males have - like females - evolved a spermalege. The male spermalege looks similar but not identical to the typical female spermalege and males receive fewer stabbings than females. In one cave around 80% of the females were found to mimic the male version of the spermalege and such females receive fewer stabbings from males than females that have the original spermalege type.
