= Jacques Carayon =

French entomologist (1916–1997)

- Born: 11 November 1916; Toulouse, France
- Died: 1997
- Known for: Early research of traumatic insemination
- Spouse: Gabrielle Carayon (m. 1947)
- Scientific career
- Fields: Entomology
- Workplaces: Muséum national d'histoire naturelle

Jacques Carayon (11 November 1916 – 1997) was a French entomologist, best known for his pioneering research into traumatic insemination. Carayon was Chairman of Entomology at the National Museum in Paris from 1975 to 1985.

== Career ==
Carayon was born on November 16, 1916, in Toulouse, France, the eldest of three children. His father, a medical doctor, died in 1938. This loss, coupled with an illness of his own, prevented Carayon from pursuing his medical studies, and he instead studied natural history in Paris. In 1946 and 1947, Carayon undertook expeditions to West Africa and Cameroon, and attended international entomological congresses across Europe and North America, before being elected to the Permanent Committee on International Entomological Congresses in 1980. Carayon spent his entire career based in Paris. He was President of the Entomological Society of France from 1956, and Chairman of Entomology at the National Museum in Paris from 1975 to 1985 or 1986.

== Personal life ==
Carayon married Gabrielle Carayon in 1947. His wife, a technician herself, became Carayon's assistant, and her histology work was crucial to research. He owned a house in Provence, France, from which he conducted fieldwork during the summer months. In 1990, Carayon was involved in an automobile accident in Turkey, which left him in a coma, with physical injuries from which he never fully recovered.

== Legacy ==
Upon Carayon's death in 1997, colleague James A. Slater wrote that "hemipterology has lost one of its greatest and certainly one of its most versatile students... Prof. Carayon unquestionably deserves a place, not only as one of the leaders in Hemipterology in this century, but as one of the leading figures in the entire history of the science." Carayon undertook pioneering research into traumatic insemination, and, in 1966, he was the first to suggest the spermalege structure in bedbugs as a female counter-adaptation.

== See also ==
- Traumatic insemination
