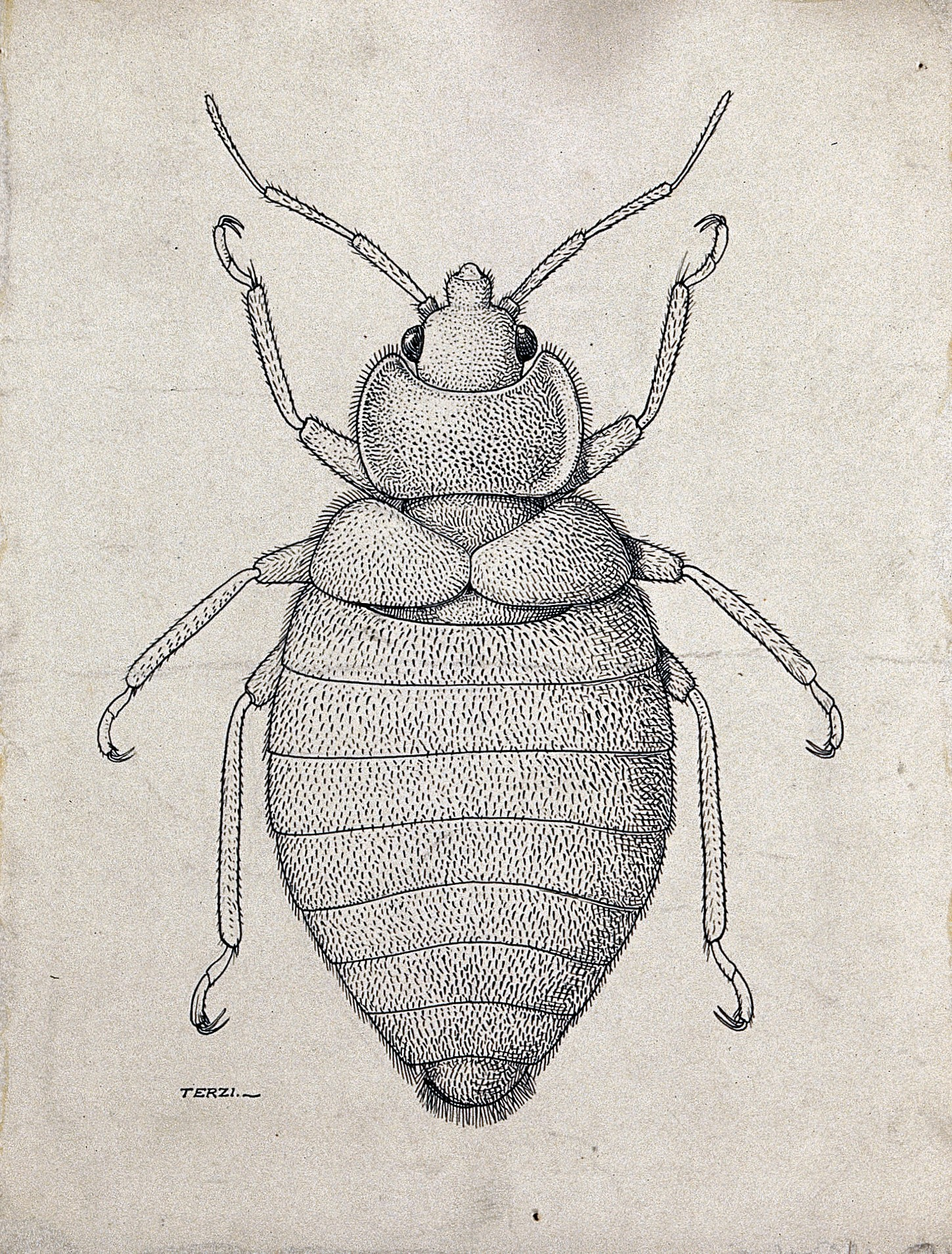

Scientific classification
- Kingdom: Animalia
- Phylum: Arthropoda
- Clade: Pancrustacea
- Class: Insecta
- Order: Hemiptera
- Suborder: Heteroptera
- Family: Cimicidae
- Genus: Cimex
- Species: C. hemipterus

Binomial name
- Cimex hemipterus (J.C.Fabricius, 1803)

= Cimex hemipterus =

Species of true bug

Cimex hemipterus, known as the tropical bed bug, is a species of bed bugs within the family Cimicidae that primarily resides in tropical climates. However, it has been reported that this species can live in more temperate climates along with the closely related bed bug species C. lectularius. C. hemipterus is a hematophagous, obligate parasite of humans. This means that it requires blood meals from their human hosts in order to survive. When bitten, humans experience itchiness, wheals, and lesions around the affected areas on the skin. This species typically resides in human domiciles within cracks, crevices, or mattresses, and are more prevalent in developing countries. Like other bed bugs, C. hemipterus is primarily active during the night time.

== Morphology ==
On average, C. hemipterus is 5.5 millimeters long and 2.5 millimeters wide. This insect has an ovular and flattened body shape. Its head is short, broad, and pointed at the tip. The rounded, black or red colored compound eyes sit laterally on both sides of the head and can be observed from both a top and underside view. A pair of four-segmented antennae are found in front of both the compound eyes. The mouthparts of C. hemipterus are made for piercing skin and sucking blood from their host. In accordance to this, the three segmented labium is long and "straw like" and the maxilla and mandible are both observed to be "blade like". The thorax of C. hemipterus is three segmented, containing the prothorax, mesothorax, and metathorax. The prothorax is about twice as long wide as it is long, and is much larger and prominent than the head (which sits in the middle of it), and both the meso- and meta- thorax. Compared to C. lectularius, C. hempiterus is observed to have a slightly narrower prothorax. This species has an eight segmented abdomen that is rounded and has a pointed tip, which contains short tufts of hair that stick out. Color varies for this species based on whether it has recently consumed a blood meal. If it hasn't had a blood meal, it displays a pale brown color. If it has recently had a blood meal, it displays a reddish color. Slight differences exist between sexes of C. hemipterus. Females are typically larger than males and have a more rounded abdomen tip.

== Life cycle ==
Cimex hemipterus exhibits a hemimetabolous life cycle, which means the insect goes through multiple nymphal life stages, where their body shape and feeding behavior closely resembles that of the adult stage. The eggs of C. hemipterus have been known to hatch anywhere from 4–12 days after being laid. This species goes through five nymphal stages before developing into an adult, with each stage of nymphs being involved in human blood-feeding. The first four nymphal stages each go through an average development time of 3–4 days, while the fifth nymphal stage develops in 4–5 days. Compared to C. lectularius, C. hemipterus goes through slightly longer developmental phases. Adults can live anywhere from 6–12 months, with females typically living longer than males.

== Insecticide resistance ==
Following widespread use of DDT in the 20th century, DDT resistance among C. hemipterus has been reported among populations in tropical and subtropical regions. This has caused re-emergences of widespread C. hemipterus infestations in countries in the southern hemisphere, such as Australia and Sri Lanka. Resistance to pyrethroids has also been reported.

== Medical importance ==
The primary medical concern associated with C. hemipterus is associated with the skin. When biting their hosts, they inject saliva containing a variety of components. These components include anesthetics, vasodilating compounds, and anticoagulants. These factors act to continue blood flow to the bitten area and ensure the host does not feel the bite. These bites lead to skin lesions and itchiness, which is a nuisance to humans. While bedbugs are not documented as being biological vectors of disease, there is evidence to suggest they could potentially act as vectors of Trypanosoma cruzi, a protist that causes Chagas disease in humans.
