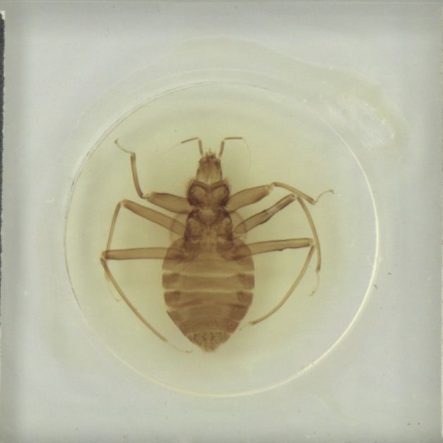
- Preserved adult female of P. cavernis

Scientific classification
- Kingdom: Animalia
- Phylum: Arthropoda
- Clade: Pancrustacea
- Class: Insecta
- Order: Hemiptera
- Suborder: Heteroptera
- Family: Cimicidae
- Genus: Primicimex; Barber, 1941
- Species: P. cavernis

Binomial name
- Primicimex cavernis Barber, 1941

Synonyms
- Primicimex caverna Barber, 1941

= Primicimex =

Genus of true bugs

Primicimex is a monotypic genus of ectoparasitic bed bugs in the family Cimicidae, the only species being Primicimex cavernis, which is both the largest cimicid, and the most primitive one. It feeds on bats and was described from Ney Cave in Medina County, Texas but has since been found in four other caves in Guatemala, Mexico, and southern United States.

== Description ==
Like all cimicids, Primicimex cavernis is flat and oval-shaped, becoming plumper after feeding. It is unable to fly and has beak-like mouthparts with which it pierces the skin and sucks the blood of its host. It differs from other cimicids (except Bucimex chilensis) in having claws and a row of erect, peg-like spines on the tarsus and has been observed using these structures to cling onto the bat's pelage.

== Ecology ==
Primicimex cavernis and its nearest relative, Bucimex chilensis, are the only members of the cimicid subfamily Primicimicinae. Their hosts are exclusively bats; in the case of P. cavernis, this is the Mexican free-tailed bat (Tadarida brasiliensis), although the ghost-faced bat (Mormoops megalophylla), which roosts in the same cave, may act as a secondary host. Ney Cave is a limestone cave in semiarid savannah grassland with oak (Quercus), mesquite (Prosopis) and grasses. The cave is a seasonal roost used by the bats as nursery quarters, and at dusk during the summer, upward of 400,000 bats may stream out of the cave entrance to forage for insects, returning to the roost before dawn. The young are mostly born in June and remain in the roost until able to fly, at about 40 days of age. Cimicids have the ability to survive for long periods without feeding, and this allows Primicimex cavernis to hide in crevices, awaiting the return of their hosts from their over-wintering sites.

Like other cimicids, Primicimex cavernis feeds exclusively on blood. It also performs traumatic insemination with the sperm being injected through the body wall but it is exceptional within the family in that at the injection site females do not possess a special female organ called the spermalege.
