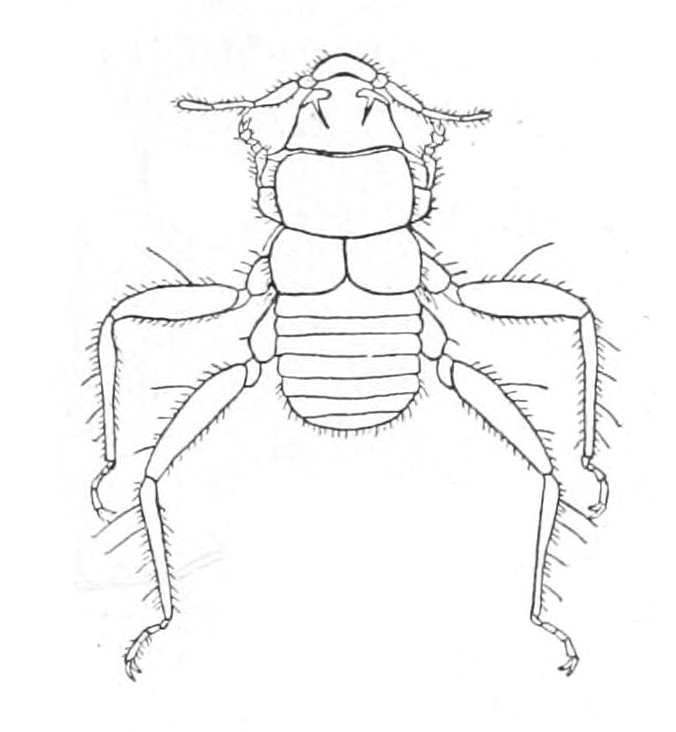
- Polyctenes sp.

Scientific classification
- Kingdom: Animalia
- Phylum: Arthropoda
- Clade: Pancrustacea
- Class: Insecta
- Order: Hemiptera
- Suborder: Heteroptera
- Superfamily: Cimicoidea
- Family: Polyctenidae; Westwood, 1874

Subfamilies
- Polycteninae; Hesperocteninae

= Polyctenidae =

Family of true bugs

The Polyctenidae are a rarely collected family of parasitic bugs of the superfamily Cimicoidea. Polyctenidae species or bat bugs are obligate, hematophagous ectoparasites of bats. These insects are not to be confused with cimicid bat bugs, which are members of the family Cimicidae. A significant relationship appears to occur between the family groups and the species of hosts that indicates co-evolution and specialization. Polyctenidae and Cimicidae are considered to be sister taxa.

There are currently 32 species of polyctenid bat bugs recognized worldwide belonging to two subfamilies and five genera. Polyctenidae species occur both in the Old World (subfamily Polycteninae) and New World (subfamily Hesperocteninae).

== Subtaxa ==
- Subfamily Polycteninae:
  - Genus Adroctenes
    - Adroctenes horvathi
    - Adroctenes jordani
    - Adroctenes magnus
  - Genus Eoctenes
    - Eoctenes intermedius
    - Eoctenes spasmae
    - Eoctenes sinae
    - Eoctenes ferrisi
    - Eoctenes maai
    - Eoctenes nycteridis
    - Eoctenes coleurae
  - Genus Hypoctenes
    - Hypoctenes petiolatus
    - Hypoctenes quadratus
    - Hypoctenes hutsoni
    - Hypoctenes clarus
    - Hypoctenes faini
  - Genus Polyctenes
    - Polyctenes molossus
- Subfamily Hesperocteninae:
  - Genus Hesperoctenes
    - Hesperoctenes abalosi
    - Hesperoctenes angustatus
    - Hesperoctenes cartus
    - Hesperoctenes chorote
    - Hesperoctenes eumops
    - Hesperoctenes fumarius
    - Hesperoctenes giganteus
    - Hesperoctenes hermsi
    - Hesperoctenes impressus
    - Hesperoctenes limai
    - Hesperoctenes longiceps
    - Hesperoctenes minor
    - Hesperoctenes parvulus
    - Hesperoctenes setosus
    - Hesperoctenes tarsalis
    - Hesperoctenes vicinus
