= Psitticimex =

Scientific classification
- Kingdom: Animalia
- Phylum: Arthropoda
- Class: Insecta
- Order: Hemiptera
- Suborder: Heteroptera
- Family: Cimicidae
- Subfamily: Haematosiphoninae
- Genus: Psitticimex; Usinger, 1966
- Species: P. uritui

Binomial name
- Psitticimex uritui (Lent & Abalos, 1946)

Genus of true bugs

Psitticimex is a monotypic parasitoid genus of true bug in the family Cimicidae, consisting only of P. uritui, primarily found in monk parakeets. Uritui is the most common Heteroptera parasite in monk parakeet and parrot nests studied, according to a 2019 study. Uritui is also found in brown cacholote nests, due to the monk parakeet using abandoned cacholote nests.
