= Oeciacus =

Scientific classification
- Kingdom: Animalia
- Phylum: Arthropoda
- Clade: Pancrustacea
- Class: Insecta
- Order: Hemiptera
- Suborder: Heteroptera
- Family: Cimicidae
- Subfamily: Cimicinae
- Genus: Oeciacus; Stål, 1873

Genus of true bugs

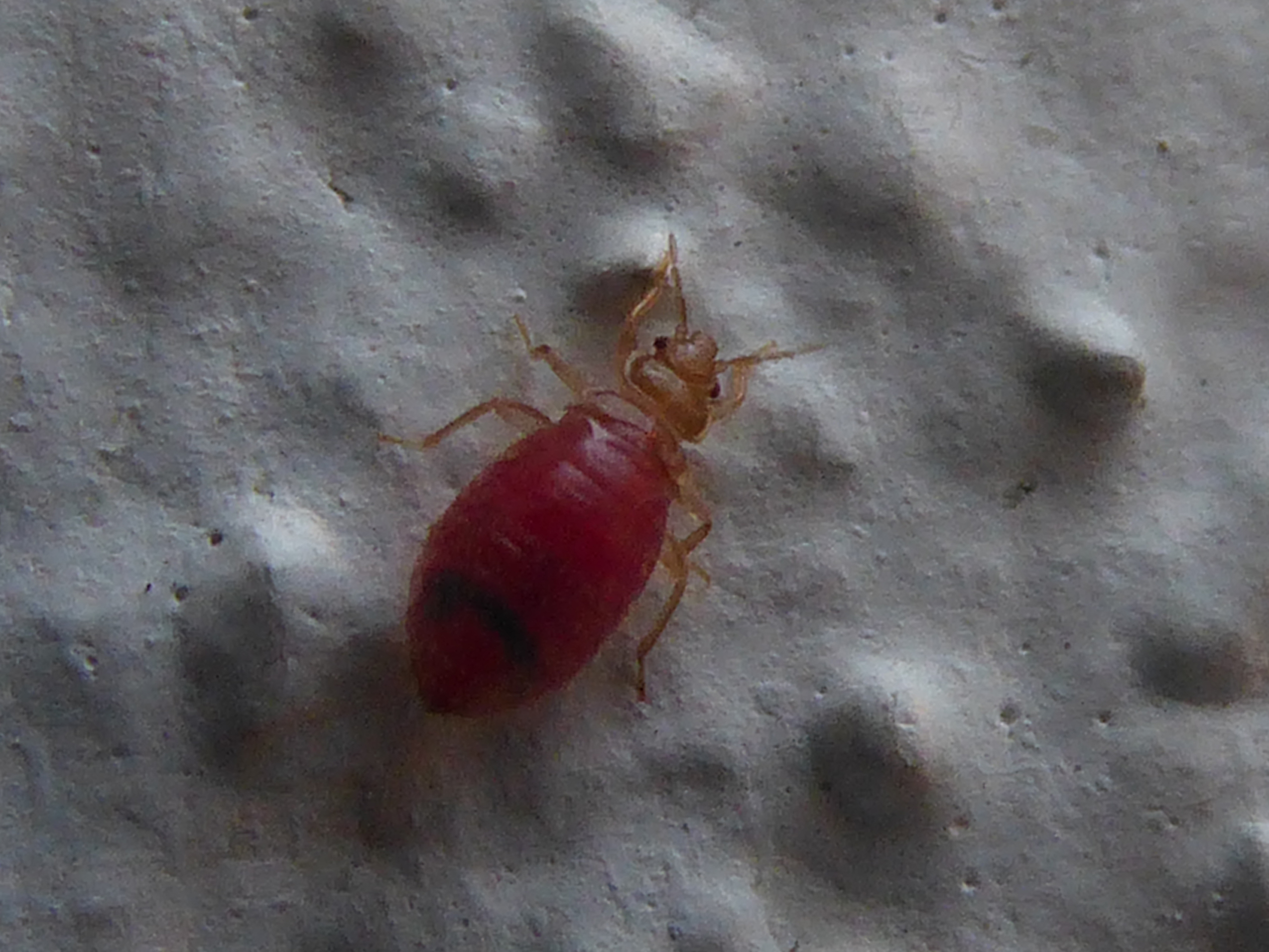
Oeciacus hirundinis

Oeciacus is a genus of bed bugs in the family Cimicidae. There are at least three described species in Oeciacus.

== Species ==
These three species belong to the genus Oeciacus:

- Oeciacus hirundinis (Lamarck, 1816)
- Oeciacus montandoni (Pericart, 1972)
- Oeciacus vicarius (Horvath, 1912), the American swallow bug
