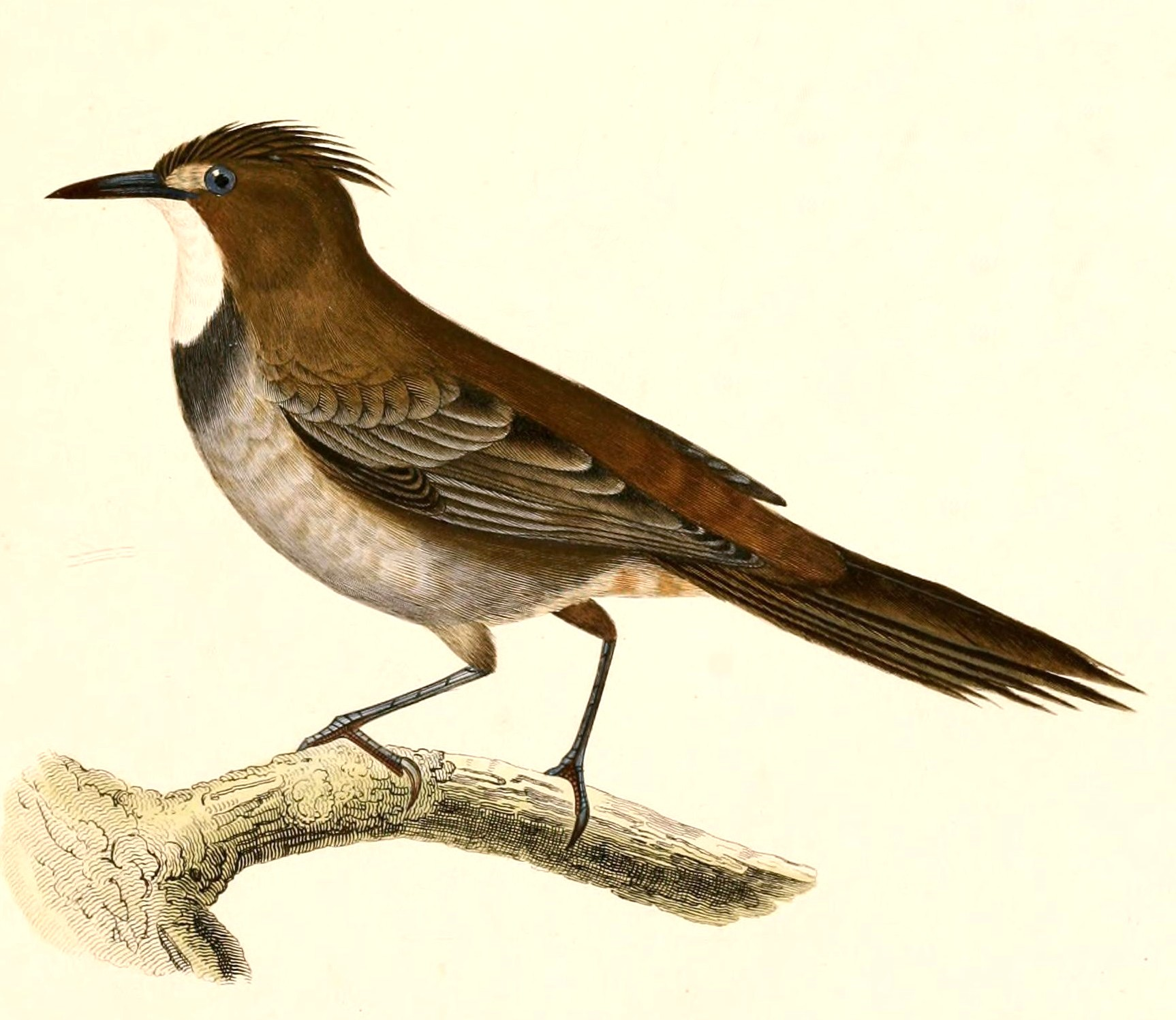

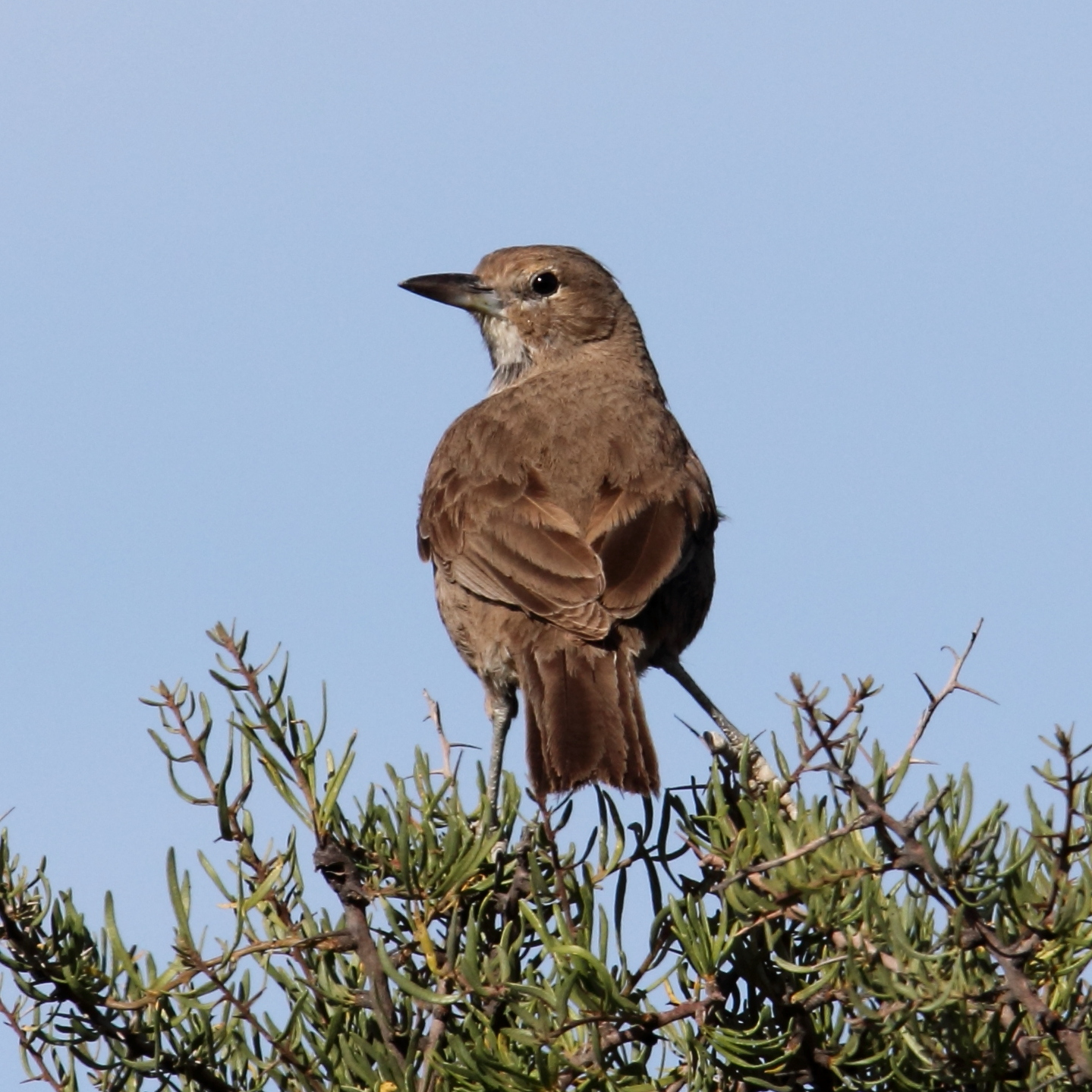

Conservation status
- Least Concern (IUCN 3.1)

Scientific classification
- Kingdom: Animalia
- Phylum: Chordata
- Class: Aves
- Order: Passeriformes
- Family: Furnariidae
- Genus: Pseudoseisura
- Species: P. gutturalis

Binomial name
- Pseudoseisura gutturalis (D'Orbigny & Lafresnaye, 1838)

= White-throated cacholote =

White-throated cachalote

Species of bird

The white-throated cacholote (Pseudoseisura gutturalis) is a species of bird in the Furnariinae subfamily of the ovenbird family Furnariidae. It is endemic to Argentina.

== Taxonomy and systematics ==
The white-throated cacholote's taxonomy is unsettled. The International Ornithological Committee and BirdLife International's Handbook of the Birds of the World assign it two subspecies, the nominate P. g. gutturalis (D'Orbigny & Lafresnaye, 1838) and P. g. ochroleuca (Olrog, 1959). The Clements taxonomy does not recognize P. g. ochroleuca, treating the white-throated cacholote as monotypic.

This article follows the two-subspecies model.

== Description ==
The white-throated cacholote is 22 to 23 cm (8.7 to 9.1 in) long and weighs 63 to 79 g (2.2 to 2.8 oz). It is one of the largest furnariids and has a small crest. The sexes have the same plumage. Adults of the nominate subspecies have a white eyering and lores on an otherwise dark brownish gray face. Their crown and upperparts are also dark brownish gray. Their wings are mostly the same dark brownish gray, with slightly paler edges on the coverts and flight feathers. Their tail is dark fuscous gray with slightly paler edges to the feathers; the feathers have few barbs on their ends. Their chin and throat are white with black at the bottom of the throat. Their breast and belly are a paler brownish gray than the back, with grayish white tips on many feathers giving a "frosty" appearance. Their vent area and undertail coverts are slightly paler than the breast and belly. Their iris is yellow to creamy-buff or dark brown, their maxilla dark gray, their mandible pale bluish with a dark gray tip, and their legs and feet gray. Juveniles have some light mottling or barring on the underparts. Subspecies P. g. ochroleuca is paler and more sandy overall than the nominate.

== Distribution and habitat ==
Subspecies P. g. ochroleuca of the white-throated cacholote is the more northerly of the two; it is found in northwestern Argentina. The nominate subspecies is found in central Argentina. The geographic dividing line or overlap area between them is unclear. The species inhabits generally barren landscapes such as arid scrublands in lowlands and montane valleys; in the north it also occurs in woodlands dominated by Prosopis. In elevation it ranges from sea level to 2,900 m (9,500 ft).

== Behavior ==
=== Movement ===
The white-throated cacholote is a year-round resident throughout its range.

=== Feeding ===
The white-throated cacholote feeds primarily on arthropods. It usually forages in pairs or small groups that might be families. It feeds mostly on the ground, gleaning, probing, and digging in soil. It has also been observed digging into cactus stems.

=== Breeding ===
The white-throated cacholote breeds in the austral spring and summer; eggs have been noted in November and February and nestlings in November and December. It is thought to be monogamous. Its nest is a mass of sticks about half again as long as it is wide with an entrance tube on its upper side and an inner chamber lined with grass and small twigs. It rests on a horizontal branch, typically in a bush and between 1 and 3 m (3 and 10 ft) above the ground. The clutch size is three to five eggs. The incubation period is about 18 days and fledging occurs about 21 days after hatch.

=== Infanticide ===
A 2022 paper documented a case in which an adult white-throated cachalote killed the two nestlings of a breeding pair. The sex of the adult was not known but it was not one of the nestlings' parents. The paper's authors note that the observation lends support to the "resource competition hypothesis", under which the deaths leave more food, and potentially future nest material, available. The event was the first documented occurrence of non-parental infanticide by a member of family Furnariidae.

=== Vocalization ===
The white-throated cacholote's song is very loud; it reportedly carries nearly 2 km (1 mi). It is a "cacophonous explosion of variable, harsh, raucous notes" and is often sung in duet.

== Status ==
The IUCN has assessed the white-throated cacholote as being of Least Concern. It has large range and an unknown population size that is believed to be stable. No immediate threats have been identified. It is considered uncommon to fairly common and "[e]vidently tolerant of fairly extensive anthropogenic habitat disturbance".
