= Spermalege =

Special-purpose organ found in bed bugs

The spermalege (also known as the organ of Berlese or organ of Ribaga) is a special-purpose organ found in female bed bugs that appears to have evolved to mitigate the effects of traumatic insemination. The spermalege has two embryologically distinct parts, known as the ectospermalege and mesospermalege. The evolution of the spermalege as a female counter-adaptation for traumatic insemination was proposed by the French entomologist Jacques Carayon in 1966.

== Structure ==
The spermalege has two embryologically distinct parts, known as the ectospermalege and mesospermalege.

The ectospermalege is derived from the ectoderm. It consists of a groove in the right-handed posterior margin of the fifth sclerite, overlying a pleural membrane. In order to access the female's haemocoel during traumatic insemination, male bed bugs insert their needle-like aedeagus into the groove, and pierce the pleural membrane. This piercing produces wounds that leave melanised scars.

The mesospermalege is derived from the mesoderm. It is a membrane-bound sac attached to the wall of the haemocoel, directly beneath the groove of the ectospermalege. In all bed bug species except Primicimex cavernis, sperm are injected into the mesospermalege. The structure contains two main types of hemocyte, though their function is not yet fully understood. The first of these is phagocytic and may absorb seminal fluid, whereas the other may digest spermatozoa.

== Function ==
The ectospermalege is visible externally in most bed bug species, giving the male a target through which to impale the female. In species without an externally visible ectospermalege, traumatic insemination takes place over a wide range of the body surface.

Exactly why males 'comply' with this aspect of female control over the site of mating is unclear, especially as male P. cavernis appear to be able to penetrate the abdomen at a number of points independent of the presence of an ectospermalege. One possibility is that mating outside the ectospermalege reduces female fecundity to such an extent that the mating male's paternity is significantly reduced ... The ectospermalege appears to act as a mating guide, directing the male's copulatory interest, and therefore damage, to a restricted area of the female's abdomen.

The spermalege structure serves to reduce the wounding and immunological costs of traumatic insemination. The piercing wound typically occurs in the exocuticle of the mesospermalege, and is repaired by "scarring substance" developed in the epidermis. At least nine species of bacteria and fungi have been identified from the male intromittent organ, and the mesospermalege reduces the likelihood of infection from such pathogenic organisms.
