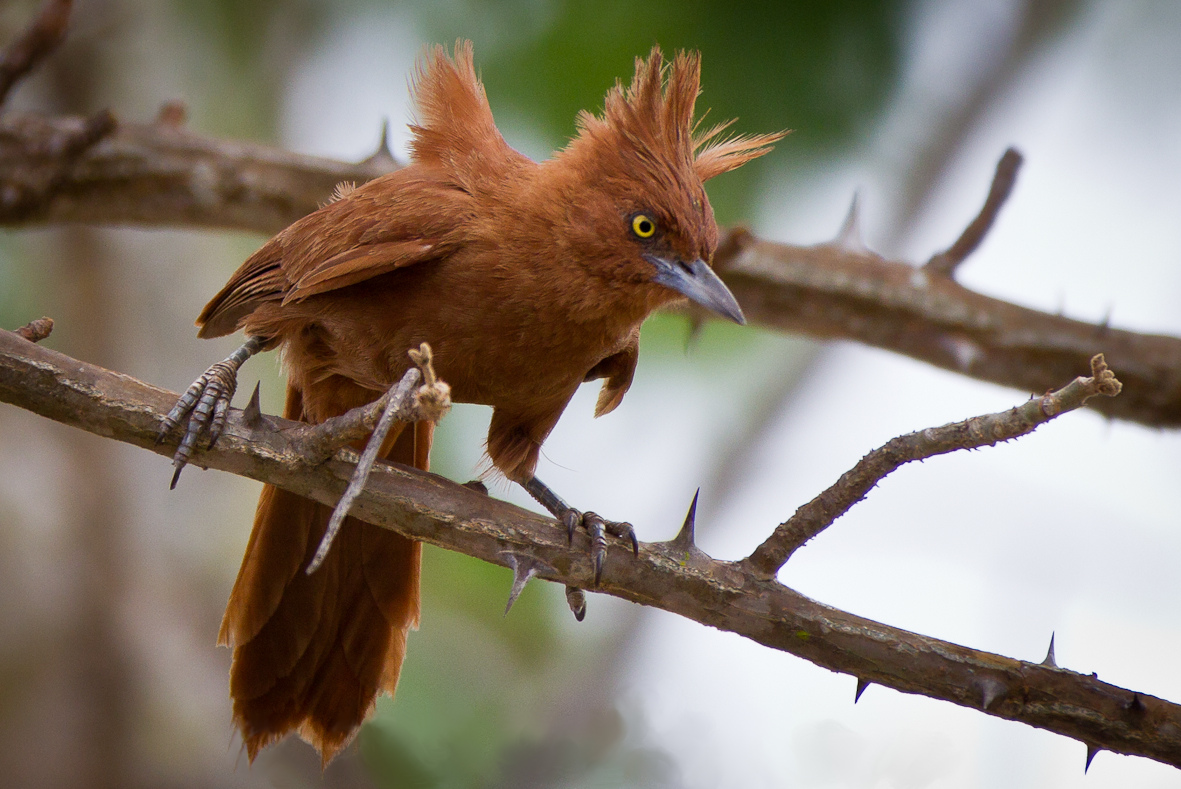
- In Paraíba, Brazil

Conservation status
- Least Concern (IUCN 3.1)

Scientific classification
- Kingdom: Animalia
- Phylum: Chordata
- Class: Aves
- Order: Passeriformes
- Family: Furnariidae
- Genus: Pseudoseisura
- Species: P. cristata

Binomial name
- Pseudoseisura cristata (Spix, 1824)

= Caatinga cacholote =

Species of bird

The Caatinga cacholote (Pseudoseisura cristata) is a species of bird in the Furnariinae subfamily of the ovenbird family Furnariidae. It is endemic to Brazil.

== Taxonomy and systematics ==
The Caatinga cacholote is monotypic. However, what is now the grey-crested cacholote (P. unirufa) was previously considered a subspecies of it. The two-subspecies P. cristata was then called the rufous cacholote. The two taxa were split following the data in a paper published in 2000.

== Description ==
The Caatinga cacholote is 25 to 26 cm (9.8 to 10 in) long. It is a large, crested, furnariid with a long bill. The sexes have the same plumage. Adults are mostly bright reddish-rufous that is somewhat paler on their underparts. Their flight feathers have fuscous tips and the ends of the tail feathers lack barbs. Their iris is yellow. Juveniles have a shorter crest than adults, with some dusky streaks or bars on the face and underparts and a bluish gray iris.

== Distribution and habitat ==
The Caatinga cacholote is found in eastern Brazil in an area bounded roughly by eastern Maranhão, Paraíba, and central Minas Gerais. It inhabits the woodlands and scrub of the Caatinga biome and also tropical deciduous forest. Away from areas of dense human population it is common around dwellings. In elevation it ranges from 50 to 500 m (160 to 1,600 ft).

== Behavior ==
=== Movement ===
The Caatinga cacholote is a year-round resident throughout its range.

=== Feeding ===
The Caatinga cacholote feeds on arthropods and plant material. It usually forages in pairs and usually on the ground, where it probes and digs for its prey.

=== Breeding ===
The Caatinga cacholote's breeding season has not been defined. Though the species is believed to be mostly monogamous, several observations of breeding pairs included up to four apparent adults, all of whom provisioned nestlings. It is not known if the helpers are related or not to the primary pair. Its nest is a mass of thorny sticks that is typically twice as long as it is wide, placed in a tree fork or on a utility pole. An entrance tunnel near its top leads to an inner chamber lined with pieces of bark and snake skin. One nest in Ceará incorporated a large number of anthropogenic materials including razor blades, a fork, plastic items and fragments, paper, and barbed wire. The clutch size, incubation period, time to fledging, and further details of parental care are not known.

=== Vocalization ===
The Caatinga cacholote typically sings in duet. One bird, thought to be the male, "gives a long series of well-spaced, very loud, piercing 'tjew' notes". The presumed female replies with "a series of 15–35 well-spaced buzzy 'zjeep' notes". The species' call is "a single 'chuk' ".

== Status ==
The IUCN has assessed the Caatinga cacholote as being of Least Concern. It has large range and an unknown population size that is believed to be increasing. No immediate threats have been identified. It is considered common "especially where caatinga [is] severely degraded or overgrazed" and has "extended its range locally where forest has been cleared". In addition, it occurs in several protected areas.
