= Pascale Carayon =

French-American industrial engineer

Pascale Carayon is a French-American industrial engineer whose research applies human factors engineering to health systems and patient safety. She is a professor emerita at the University of Wisconsin–Madison.

== Education and career ==
Carayon is originally from France. She has an engineering diploma from École Centrale Paris, earned in 1984. She completed a Ph.D. in industrial engineering from the University of Wisconsin–Madison in 1988, supervised by Michael J. Smith.

On completing her doctorate, she remained at the University of Wisconsin–Madison as a faculty member. She held the Leon and Elizabeth Janssen Professorship from 2019 until 2021. She retired in 2021, becoming a professor emerita.

== Recognition ==
Carayon was elected to the National Academy of Engineering in 2024 "for application of human factors engineering to health care systems to improve patient safety". She is also a member of the International Academy of Quality and Safety in Health Care (elected 2020), a Fellow of the Human Factors and Ergonomics Society, and a Fellow of the International Ergonomics Association. In 2020 she was named a National Associate of the National Academy of Sciences.

She is a 2012 recipient of the International Ergonomics Association Distinguished Service Award, a 2015 recipient of the Human Factors and Ergonomics Society A. R. Lauer Safety Award, a 2016 recipient of the John M. Eisenberg Patient Safety and Quality Award, and a 2018 recipient of the International Ergonomics Association John Wilson Award.
