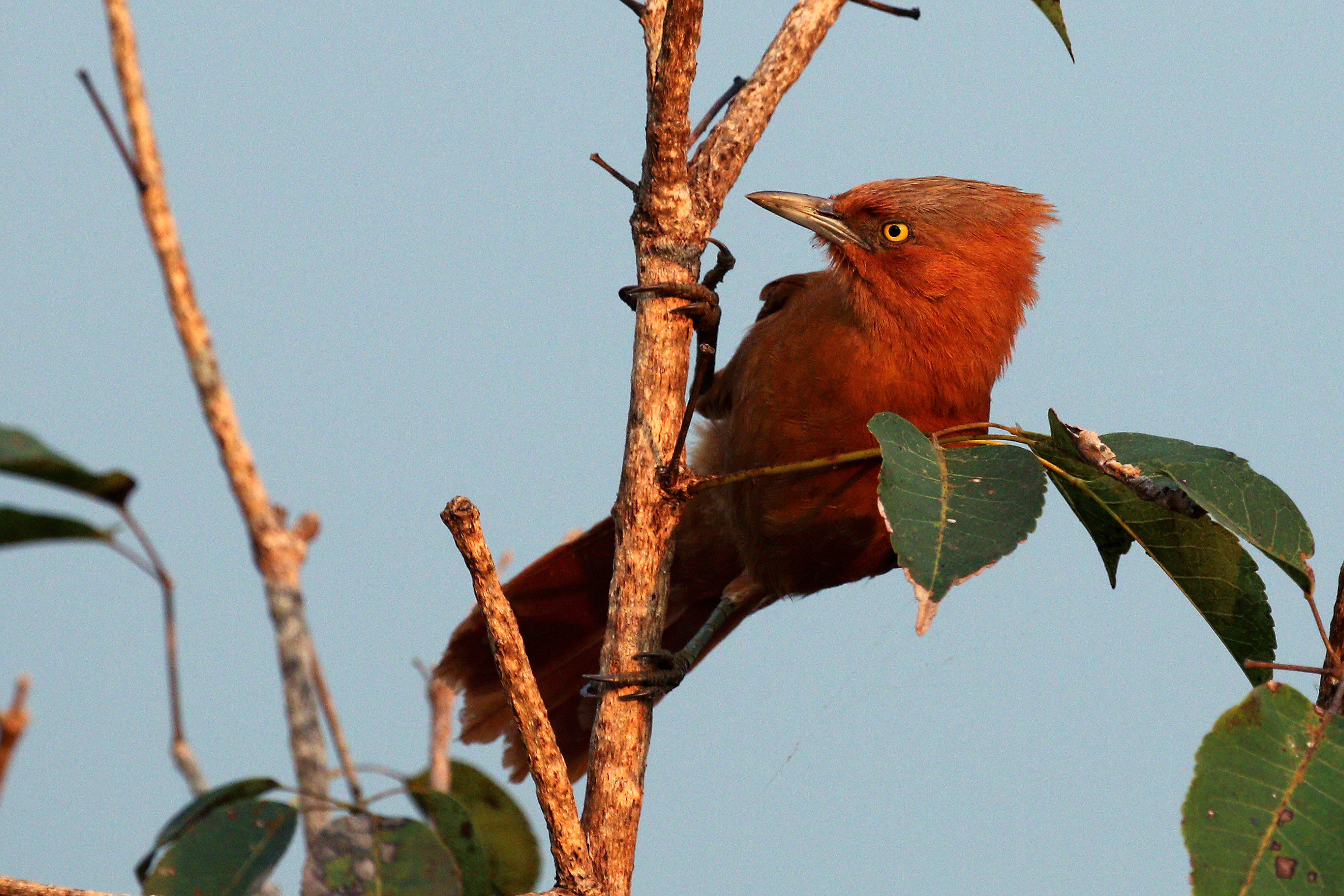
- In the Pantanal, Brazil

Conservation status
- Least Concern (IUCN 3.1)

Scientific classification
- Kingdom: Animalia
- Phylum: Chordata
- Class: Aves
- Order: Passeriformes
- Family: Furnariidae
- Genus: Pseudoseisura
- Species: P. unirufa

Binomial name
- Pseudoseisura unirufa (D'Orbigny & Lafresnaye, 1838)

Synonyms
- Pseudoseisura cristata unirufa

= Grey-crested cacholote =

Species of bird

The grey-crested cacholote (Pseudoseisura unirufa) is a species of bird in the Furnariinae subfamily of the ovenbird family Furnariidae. It is found in Bolivia, Brazil, and Paraguay.

== Taxonomy and systematics ==
The grey-crested cacholote is monotypic. It was previously considered a subspecies of the Caatinga cacholote (P. cristata) which was then called the rufous cacholote. The two taxa were split following the data in a paper published in 2000. Confusingly, and contrary to the suggestion of the 2000 paper's authors, the South American Classification Committee of the American Ornithological Society, the Clements taxonomy, and some field guide authors call P. unirufa the rufous cacholote.

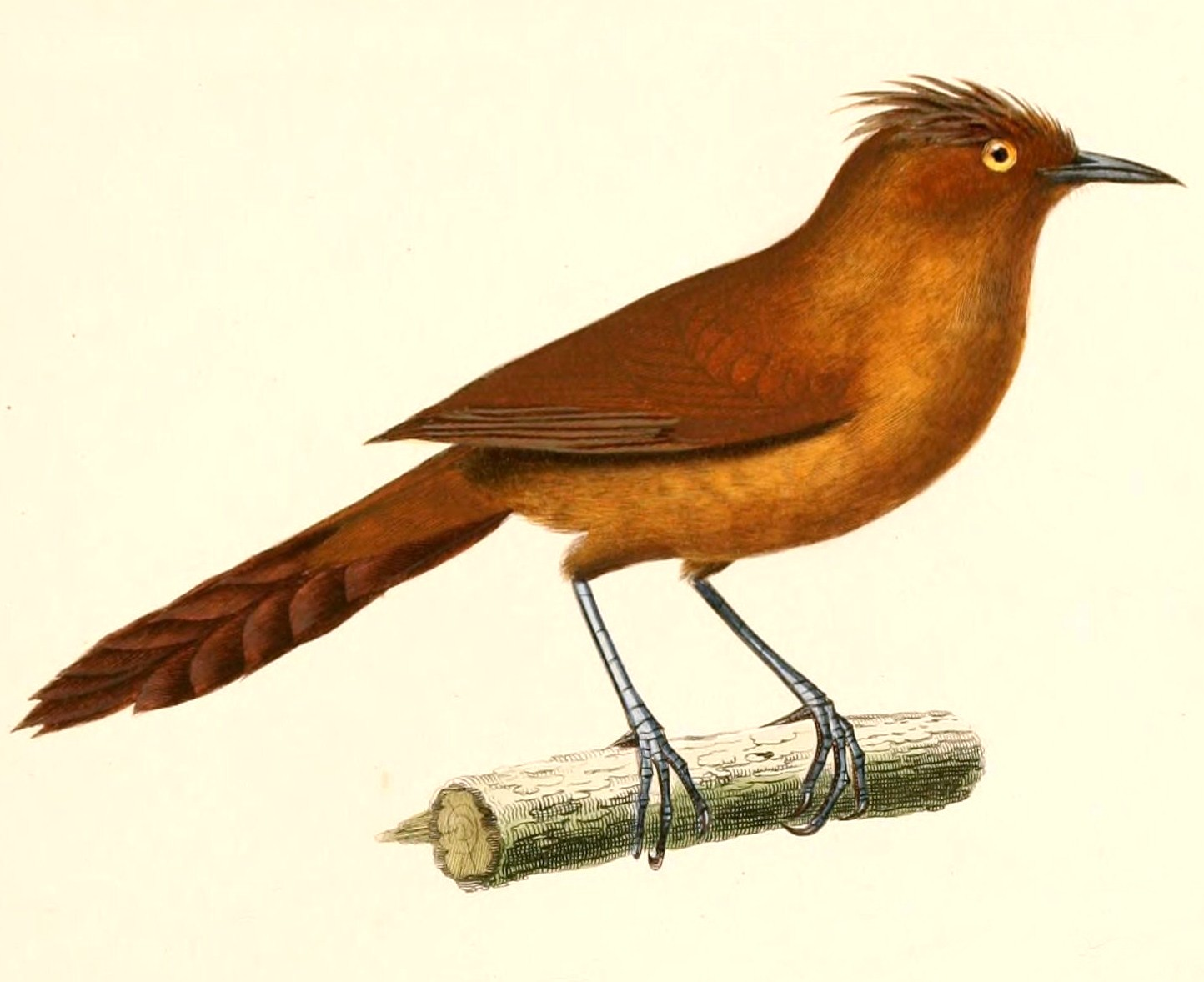
Pseudoseisura unirufa illustration by d'Orbigny, 1847

== Description ==
The grey-crested cacholote is 20 to 21 cm (7.9 to 8.3 in) long and weighs 42 to 57 g (1.5 to 2.0 oz). It is a large, crested, furnariid. The sexes have the same plumage. Adults are mostly bright reddish-rufous that is somewhat paler on their underparts. Their crest varies from entirely rufous to almost entirely grayish. The center of their throat has an orange tinge. Their flight feathers have fuscous tips and the ends of the tail feathers lack barbs. Their iris is yellow to buff-yellow, their bill blue-gray to gray with a paler mandible, and their legs and feet olive to greenish gray. Juveniles have a shorter crest than adults and less uniformity in their color. The formerly conspecific Caatinga cacholote is similar but larger and has no gray in its crown.

== Distribution and habitat ==
The grey-crested cacholote has a disjunct distribution. One population is found in Beni Department and extreme northwestern Santa Cruz Department of north-central Bolivia. The other is found in southeastern Santa Cruz, Mato Grosso and Mato Grosso do Sul states in Brazil, and in northern Paraguay. The species inhabits gallery forest, woodlands, and seasonally flooded savanna within the Pantanal, and is often found near human dwellings. In elevation it ranges between 300 and 500 m (1,000 and 1,600 ft).

== Behavior ==
=== Movement ===
The gray-crested cacholote is a year-round resident throughout its range.

=== Feeding ===
The grey-crested cacholote's diet and feeding behavior are poorly known. It probably feeds mostly on arthropods with some fruit and seeds. It usually forages in pairs and usually on the ground, where it gleans, probes, and digs for its prey.

=== Breeding ===
The grey-crested cacholote is thought to be monogamous and to breed in the austral spring and summer. Its nest is a mass of sticks and branches that is typically twice as long as it is wide, with feathers, shells, bones, and other items incorporated, and placed in a tree about 4 or 5 m (10 or 20 ft) above the ground. An entrance tunnel near its bottom leads to an inner chamber lined with pieces of bark and snake skin. The clutch size, incubation period, time to fledging, and details of parental care are not known.

=== Vocalization ===
The grey-crested cacholote usually sings in duet, "sustained, loud, accelerating, slightly descending 'chew' notes mixed with chattering and rattles, finishing with combined cackling". The species' call is "a single 'chuk' ".

== Status ==
The IUCN has assessed the grey-crested cacholote as being of Least Concern. It has large range and an unknown population size that is believed to be stable. No immediate threats have been identified. The species is "[n]ot particularly well known" but is common around ranch buildings and other human dwellings.
