= Cimexopsis =

Scientific classification
- Kingdom: Animalia
- Phylum: Arthropoda
- Clade: Pancrustacea
- Class: Insecta
- Order: Hemiptera
- Suborder: Heteroptera
- Family: Cimicidae
- Genus: Cimexopsis; List, 1925
- Species: C. nyctalis

Binomial name
- Cimexopsis nyctalis List, 1925

Genus of true bugs

Cimexopsis is a genus of bed bugs in the family Cimicidae. There is one described species in Cimexopsis, C. nyctalis.
