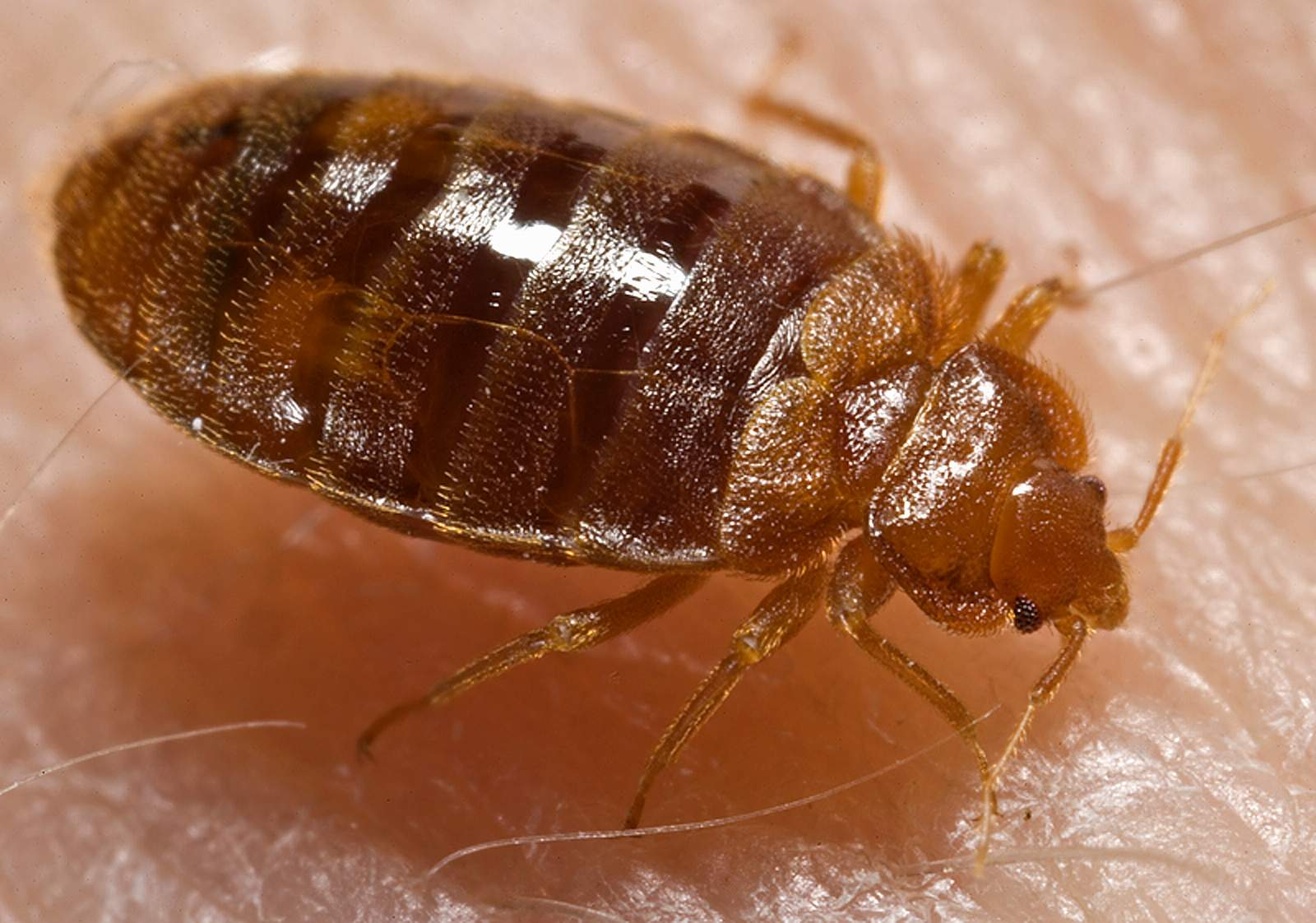
- Cimex lectularius

Scientific classification
- Kingdom: Animalia
- Phylum: Arthropoda
- Clade: Pancrustacea
- Class: Insecta
- Order: Hemiptera
- Suborder: Heteroptera
- Superfamily: Cimicoidea
- Family: Cimicidae; Latreille, 1802

Subfamilies and genera
- Subfamily Afrociminae: Genus Afrocimex; Afrocimex constrictus; Subfamily Cimicinae: Genus Bertilia; Genus Cimex; Genus Oeciacus; Genus Paracimex; Genus Propicimex; Subfamily Cacodminae: Genus Aphrania; Genus Cacodomus; Genus Crassicimex; Genus Leptocimex; Genus Loxaspis; Genus Stricticimex; Subfamily Haematosiphoninae: Genus Caminicimex; Genus Cimexopsis; Genus Haematosiphon; Genus Hesperocimex; Genus Ornithocoris; Genus Psitticimex; Genus Synxenoderus; Subfamily Latrocimicinae: Genus Latrocimex; Subfamily Primicimicinae: Genus Bucimex; Genus Primicimex

= Cimicidae =

Cimicidae Temporal range: Cenomanian–Present

Family of parasitic blood-feeding insects

The Cimicidae are a family of small parasitic bugs that feed exclusively on the blood of warm-blooded animals. They are called cimicids or, loosely, bed bugs, though the latter term properly refers to the most well-known member of the family, Cimex lectularius, the common bed bug, and its tropical relation Cimex hemipterus. The family contains over 100 species. Cimicids appeared in the fossil record in the Cretaceous period. When bats evolved in the Eocene, Cimicids switched hosts and now feed mainly on bats or birds. Members of the group have colonised humans on three occasions.

Cimicids usually feed on their host's blood every three to seven days, crawling away from the host and hiding while they digest the blood, which may take several days. This means that they specialise in vertebrate hosts that return regularly to particular sites to nest, roost or sleep. Birds and bats suit these specific requirements, as do humans now that they live in dwellings, and these are the main hosts used by the bugs. Most cimicids are able to go for long periods without feeding, over a year in some instances.

Cimicids are typically small, oval, flattened, wingless insects. They are stimulated to appear from their hiding places by cues such as a slight rise in the temperature of their surroundings. Among the family's distinctive characteristics are traumatic insemination, in which the male fertilises the eggs by piercing the female's abdominal wall with his intromittent organ. They also have distinctive paired structures called mycetomes inside their bodies, in which they harbour bacterial symbionts: these may help them to obtain nutrients they cannot get from blood. Although the insects may acquire viruses and other pathogens while feeding, these do not normally replicate inside the insect, and the infections are not transmitted to new hosts.

== Biology ==
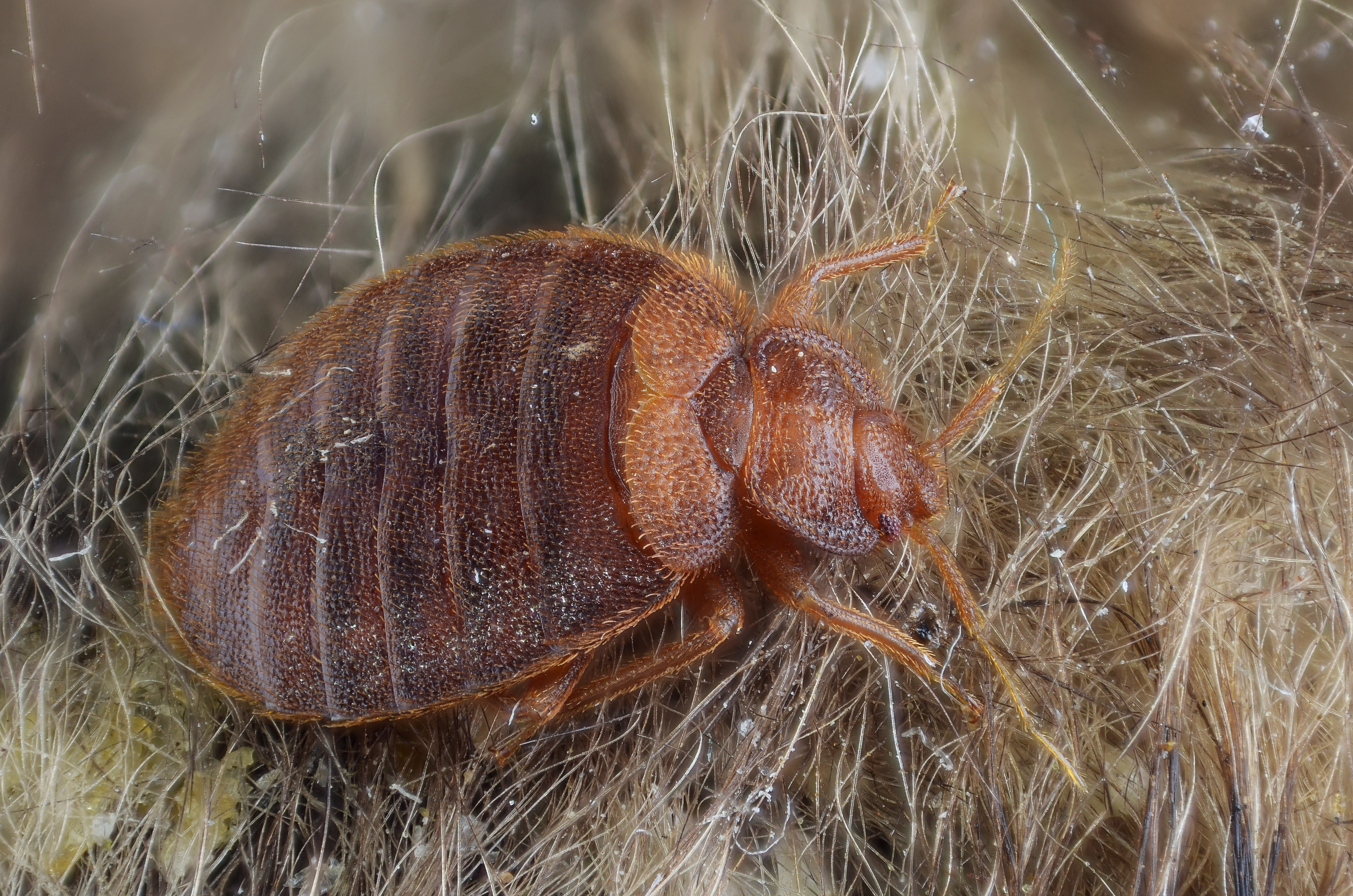
Cimex lectularius feeding on a bat

All cimicids are small, oval-shaped, and flat in appearance, although their bodies bulge after feeding. They do not fly, but have small, non-functional wing pads. They have beak-like mouthparts with which they pierce the skin and suck the blood of their hosts. They are often considered to be ectoparasites because, although they move away from the host after feeding, they remain within the confines of their host's roost, nest or dwelling; however, under a different definition, they may be considered to be micropredatory bloodsuckers.

Reproduction in cimicids involves traumatic insemination; although the female has a normal genital tract for laying eggs, the male never uses it (except in the species Primicimex cavernis), instead piercing the female's abdominal wall with his intromittent organ and injecting sperm into the spermalege, a storage structure; the sperm then migrate through the female's paragenital system to reach the eggs. This practice may have evolved as males competed with each other to place their sperm closer and closer to the ovaries; the last inseminating male sires more offspring than his predecessors. Males will mount any recently-fed bug, regardless of sex, and start probing its abdomen in the region of the spermalege, thus receiving tactile, morphological and behavioral cues revealing the sex of the mounted bug. Females occasionally die from a ruptured gut after insemination; insemination via the female reproductive tract does not normally occur, except under restrictive laboratory conditions. The females' spermalege contain immune cells that seem to reduce the risk of infection from traumatic insemination.

Feeding is required for egg production in females and probably for sperm production in males. Egg-laying behavior varies among species. C. lectularius stops laying fertile eggs about 35 to 50 days after the last insemination. The American cliff swallow bug, Oeciacus vicarius, hibernates after mating in autumn and begins laying in spring, to coincide with the return of their migratory hosts.

The five nymphal instars (stages) must each take a blood meal to develop to the next stage. An undisturbed bug may take 3–15 minutes to ingest a full meal depending on its life stage. They can survive long periods of time without feeding, reappearing from their hiding places when hosts again become available. Adult bedbugs have been reported to live three to twelve months in an untreated household situation.

In a laboratory attempt to crossbreed a female C. lectularius with C. hemipterus males, one nymph hatched out of 479 eggs laid. It possessed features of both species, suggesting it was a hybrid instead of a product of parthenogenesis.

== Behavior ==
Cimicids are attracted to hosts by a variety of cues, including heat (even a temperature difference of 1 °C) and kairomones. Host cues (at least in some species, including C. lectularius and Stricticimex antennatus) change from attractants to repellants after a cimicid has fed, causing it to move out of a danger zone after feeding.

Most cimicids feed once every three to seven days in natural conditions. C. lectularius normally feeds once every seven days and Ornithocoris toledoi every eight days, though C. hemipterus has been observed feeding every day for several days (in hot climates). Excessively hot or cold temperatures disrupt normal behavior. All cimicids harbour bacterial symbionts in paired structures known as "mycetomes". Although the significance of these has not been fully studied, they may be concerned with the biosynthesis of nutrients that the insect cannot synthesize itself, as is the case in other blood-sucking insects.

Many cimicids can go without food for long periods, one and a half years in some instances. This allows them to survive the winter at summer bat roosts even when the bats are hibernating elsewhere, and may be an important adaptive trait because of their limited dispersal ability. Cimicids have occasionally been observed clinging to the fore limbs of bats away from the roost, and this is likely to be the means by which the insects disperse. The cimicids have no special adaptations to enable them to travel in this way, however the only two members of the Primicimicinae subfamily, Bucimex chilensis and Primicimex cavernis have claws and an erect a row of peg-like spines on the tarsus, and have been observed clinging to the bat's pelage with these.

== Hosts ==
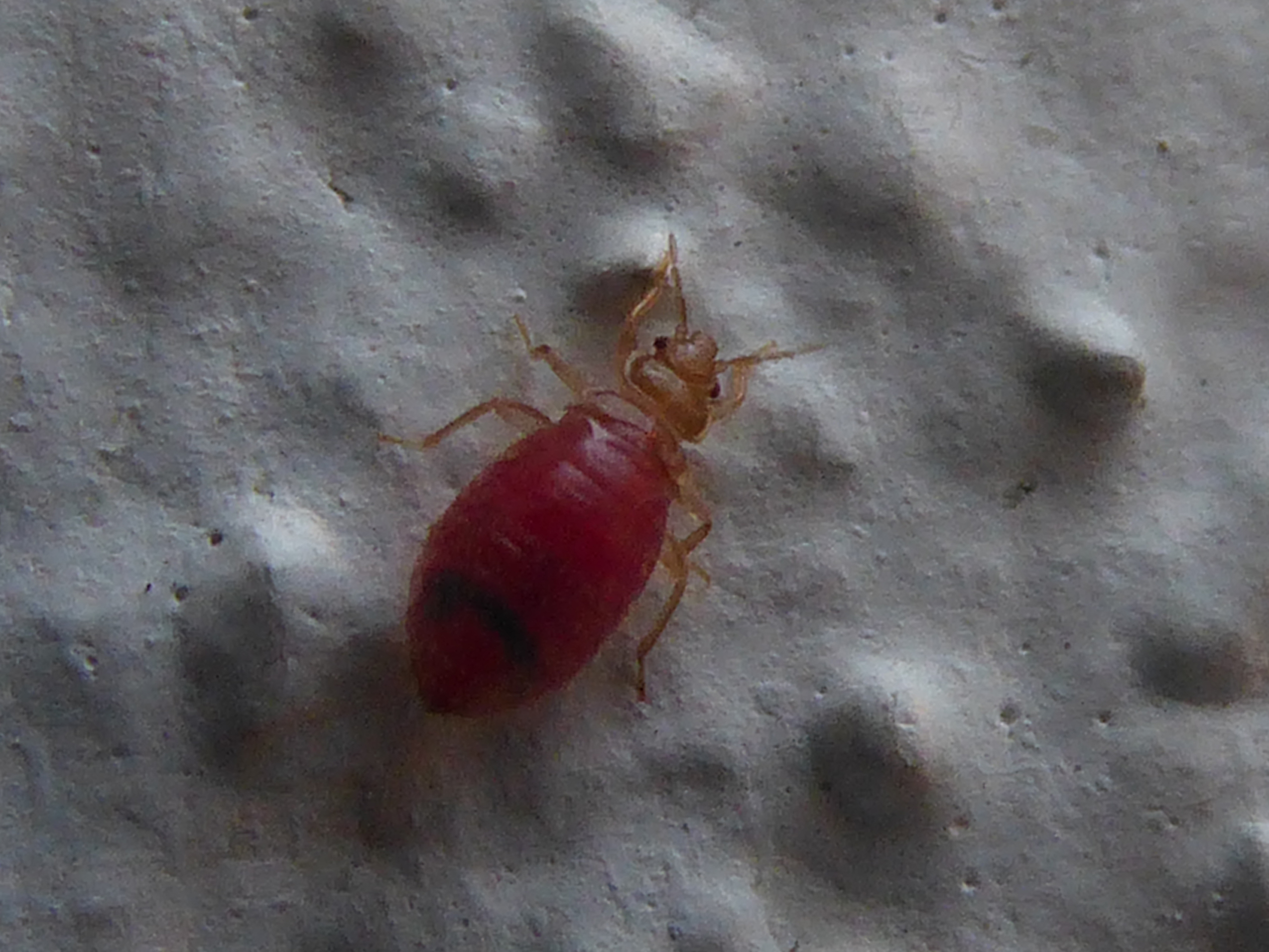
Oeciacus hirundinis feeds on swallows.

Cimicids are a specialised group of blood-sucking parasites that primarily feed on bats, birds and humans. They are thought to have evolved from predatory heteropteran ancestors, with about 60% of extant species using bats as their primary hosts. Bats are social mammals and many species congregate in communal roosts to give birth and rear their young. These roosts provide excellent conditions for their arthropod ectoparasites, with a steady temperature and opportunities for regular blood meals. However, the bats frequently groom themselves and each other, putting the parasites at risk of being eaten. Cimicids lessen this risk by hiding in concealed locations between feeding bouts, and by producing a repellent substance which makes them distasteful.

In evolutionary terms, most species of cimicid probably specialised on insectivorous bats or birds, with the possibility of dispersal to other sites via their winged hosts. On returning to a roost, a bat may only be available to cimicids for a short time before it cools down and enters a state of torpor, with reduced blood flow. When the bats lived in close proximity to humans, in caves or in the roofs of their huts, a new opportunity arose; the cimicids could make use of the large size and homeothermic properties of a human, which provided an abundant food supply that led to the growth and expansion of the ectoparasite populations.

Cimicids are relatively specialized in their choice of hosts, compared to other bloodsucking insects. Most cimicids have a preferred host, but accept some others when presented with the choice, such as C. lectularius and C. hemipterus, which are most often found among humans, but can also survive by feeding on birds, bats, rabbits, and mice. The subfamilies Primicimicinae and Latrocimicinae use New World bats as their hosts, while Afrocimicinae and Cacodminae use Old World bats. Bats represent a convenient mammal to exploit as they roost communally, returning to the same roost regularly. It is perhaps to avoid the parasites that some species of bat regularly change roosts. The subfamily Haematosiphoninae use birds in the swift and swallow families, Apodidae and Hirundinidae. One species, P. cavernis, has a very limited distribution and appears to make use of only one species of host.

Host switching is dependent on several factors, including overlap in host detection cues and ability to digest different kinds of blood. For example, the red blood cells of chickens are about 3 to 5 μm longer in diameter than those of humans, making human blood more suitable for the narrow food canal of C. lectularius. C. hemipterus may be able to vary the size of its food canal, allowing it greater flexibility in its choice of hosts. Preference for a host species can vary between populations of a given species; the causes for this are unclear.

== Effects on hosts ==
The effects of cimicid feeding on the host include causing an immune response that results in discomfort, the transmission of pathogens, secondary infections at the wound site, physiological changes such as iron deficiency, and reduced fitness (slow growth, small size, or lack of reproductive success). Hosts can defend themselves against attack by choosing non-infected sites and by grooming, while cimicids can maximise their success by reducing feeding time, selecting feeding sites which are out of reach of the hosts grooming activities, choosing to feed at times when the host is inactive, and removing themselves to a safer environment promptly when satiated.

Although viruses and other pathogens can be acquired by cimicids, they rarely transmit them to their hosts. O. vicarius is a vector of several arboviruses, but is not killed by these viruses. Trypanosoma cruzi, the trypanosome that causes Chagas disease, is rarely transmitted from cimicids to bats, but it has not been observed replicating after such transmission. The viruses HIV and hepatitis B can persist in C. lectularius for two weeks, but with no viral replication. The possibility of these and most other viruses being transmitted from C. lectularius to humans is considered extremely remote.

== Evolution ==
Polyctenidae and Cimicidae are considered to be sister taxa, the former family also being flightless and specialized to feed on the blood of bats.

A fossil bedbug, Quasicimex eilapinastes, was identified in 2008 from Late Cretaceous Burmese amber, aged 99 million years ago (mya).

Molecular analysis of five mitochondrial and nuclear genes shows that the Cimicidae, a group of over 100 species, form a clade. The Primicimicinae is sister to the clade containing all other extant species. The analysis, dated using fossils, gives an estimated date of 115 mya, in the Cretaceous, for the evolution of the first Cimicidae. When bats appeared some 50 million years later, the parasites presumably switched hosts, feeding on bats and birds from then on. The group colonised humans as hosts on three occasions. The genus Cimex is seen to be polyphyletic. An independent molecular analysis came to a similar conclusion, that bedbugs diversified and fed on other hosts long before the existence of bats, suggesting that "bats were colonized several times independently, unless the evolutionary origin of bats has been grossly underestimated."

- Cimicidae
  - Primicimicinae
    - Primicimex
    - Bucimex
  - - Cadocminae
      - Leptocimex
      - Cadocmus and allies
    - Cimicinae
      - - Paracimex
        - Oeciacus and part of "Cimex" (inc C. hemipterus and C. pipistrelli)
      - part of "Cimex" (inc C. lectularius)

Afrocimicinae, Haematosiphoninae, Latrocimicinae were not included in the analysis.
