= Traumatic insemination =

Mating practice in invertebrates

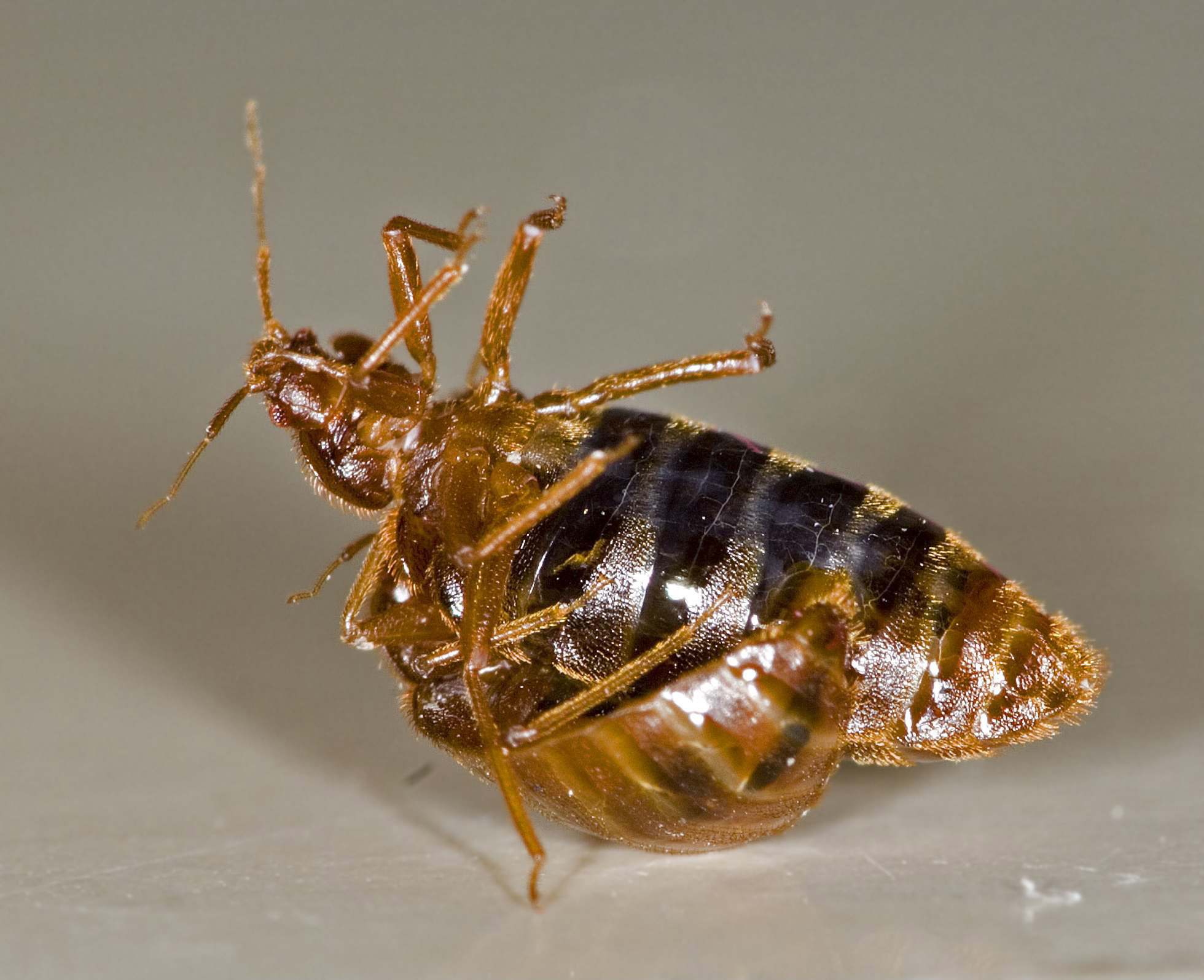
A male bed bug (Cimex lectularius) traumatically inseminates a female bed bug (top). The female's ventral exoskeleton is visibly cracked around the point of insemination.

Traumatic insemination, also known as hypodermic insemination, is the mating practice in some species of invertebrates in which the male pierces the female's abdomen with his aedeagus and injects his sperm through the wound into her abdominal cavity (hemocoel). The sperm diffuses through the female's hemolymph, reaching the ovaries and resulting in fertilization.

The process is detrimental to the female's health. It creates an open wound which impairs the female until it heals, and is susceptible to infection. The injection of sperm and ejaculatory fluids into the hemocoel can also trigger an immune reaction in the female. Bed bugs, which reproduce solely by traumatic insemination, have evolved a pair of sperm-receptacles, known as the spermalege. It has been suggested that the spermalege reduces the direct damage to the female bed bug during traumatic insemination. However experiments found no conclusive evidence for that hypothesis; as of 2003, the preferred explanation for that organ is hygienic protection against bacteria.

The evolutionary origins of traumatic insemination are disputed. Although it evolved independently in many invertebrate species, traumatic insemination is most highly adapted and thoroughly studied in bed bugs, particularly Cimex lectularius. Traumatic insemination is not limited to male-female couplings, or even couplings of the same species. Both homosexual and inter-species traumatic inseminations have been observed.

== Mechanics ==
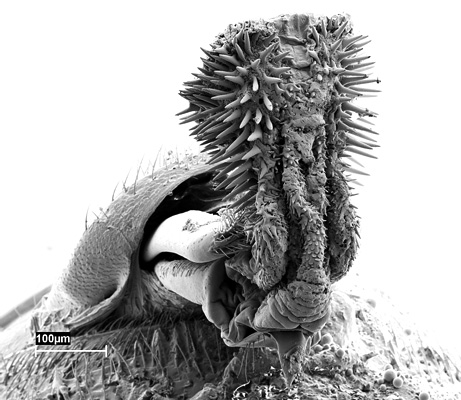
The aedeagus of a Callosobruchus analis bean weevil. Some species of insect have evolved aedeagal spines, which damage the female reproductive tract. This has led to females using various techniques to resist mating.

Video of traumatic insemination in Stylops ovinae (Strepsiptera)

In humans and other vertebrates, blood and lymph circulate in two different systems, the circulatory system and lymphatic system, which are enclosed by systems of capillaries, veins, arteries, and nodes. This is known as a closed circulatory system. Insects, however, have an open circulatory system in which blood and lymph circulate unenclosed, and mix to form a substance called hemolymph. All organs of an insect are bathed in hemolymph, through which they are provided with oxygen and nutrients.

Following traumatic insemination, sperm can migrate through the hemolymph to the female's ovaries, resulting in fertilization. The exact mechanics vary from taxon to taxon. In some orders of insects, the male genitalia (paramere) enters the female's genital tract, and a spine at its tip pierces the wall of the female's bursa copulatrix. In others, the male penetrates the outer body wall. In either case, following penetration, the male ejaculates into the female. The sperm and ejaculatory fluids diffuse through the female's hemolymph. The insemination is successful if the sperm reach the ovaries and fertilize an ovum.

Female resistance to traumatic insemination varies from one species to another. Females from some genera, including Cimex, are passive prior to and during traumatic insemination. Females in other genera resist mating and attempt to escape. This resistance might not be due to pain from the insemination process, as there is debate over whether insects experience pain.

Research into the paternity of offspring produced by traumatic insemination has found "significant" last-sperm precedence. That is, the last male to traumatically inseminate a female tends to sire most of the offspring from that female.

== Evolutionary adaptation ==
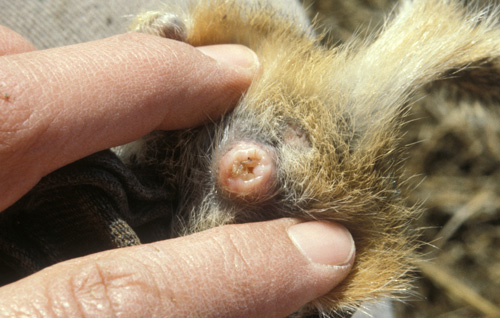
A mating plug in a female Richardson's ground squirrel (Urocitellus richardsonii)

Many reasons for the evolutionary adaptation of traumatic insemination as a mating strategy have been suggested. One is that traumatic insemination is an adaptation to the development of the mating plug, a reproductive mechanism used by many species. Once a male finishes copulating, he injects a glutinous secretion into the female's reproductive tract, thereby "literally glu[ing] her genital tract closed". Traumatic insemination allows subsequent males to bypass the female's plugged genital tract, and inject sperm directly into her circulatory system.

Others have argued that the practice of traumatic insemination may have been an adaptation for males to circumvent female resistance to mating to eliminate courtship time, allowing one male to inseminate many mates when contact between them is brief; or that it evolved as a new development in the sperm competition as a means to deposit sperm as close to the ovaries as possible.

This bizarre method of insemination probably evolved as male bed bugs competed with each other to place their sperm closer and closer to the mother lode of eggs, the ovaries. Some male insects evolved long penises with which they enter the vagina but bypass the female's storage pouch and deposit their sperm further upstream close to the ovaries. A few males, notably among bed bugs, evolved traumatic insemination instead, and eventually this strange procedure became the norm among these insects.

It has recently been discovered that members of the plant bug genus Coridromius (Miridae) also practice traumatic insemination. In these bugs, the male intromittent organ is formed by the coupling of the aedeagus with the left paramere, as in bed bugs. Females also exhibit paragenital modifications at the site of intromission, which include grooves and invaginated copulatory tubes to guide the male paramere. The evolution of traumatic insemination in Coridromius represents a third independent emergence of this form of mating within the true bugs.

== Health repercussions ==
While advantageous to the reproductive success of the individual male, traumatic insemination imposes a cost on females: reduced lifespan and decreased reproductive output. "These [costs] include (i) repair of the wound, (ii) leakage of blood, (iii) increased risk of infection through the puncture wound, and (iv) immune defence against sperm or accessory gland fluids that are introduced directly into the blood."

The male bed bug aedeagus has been shown to carry five (human) pathogenic microbes, and the exoskeleton of female bed bugs nine, including Penicillium chrysogenum, Staphylococcus saprophyticus, Stenotrophomonas maltophilia, Bacillus licheniformis, and Micrococcus luteus. Tests with blood agar have shown some of these species can survive in vivo. This suggests infections from these species may contribute to the increased mortality rate in bed bugs due to traumatic insemination.

The successive woundings each require energy to heal, leaving less energy available for other activities. Also, the wounds provide a possible point of infection which can reduce the female's lifespan. Once in the hemolymph, the sperm and ejaculatory fluids may act as antigens, triggering an immune reaction.

There is a tendency for dense colonies of bed bugs kept in laboratories to go extinct, starting with adult females. In such an environment, where mating occurs frequently, this high rate of adult female mortality suggests traumatic insemination is very detrimental to the female's health. The damage done, and the (unnecessarily) high mating rate of captive bed bugs, have been shown to cause a 25% higher-than-necessary mortality rate for females.

== Bed bug adaptation ==
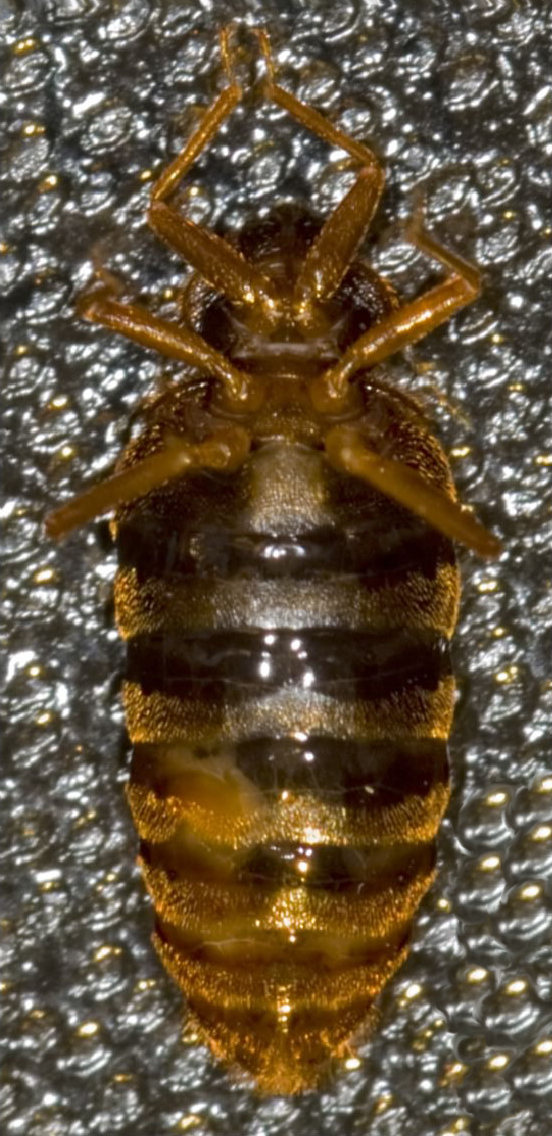
A traumatically inseminated female bed bug

The effects of traumatic insemination are deleterious to the female. Female bed bugs have evolved a pair of specialized reproductive organs ("paragenitalia") at the site of penetration. Known as the ectospermalege and mesospermalege (referred to collectively as spermalege), these organs serve as sperm-receptacles from which sperm can migrate to the ovaries. All bed bug reproduction occurs via traumatic insemination and the spermalege. The genital tract, though functional, is used only for laying fertilized eggs.

The ectospermalege is a swelling in the abdomen, often folded, filled with hemocytes. The ectospermalege is visible externally in most bed bug species, giving the male a target through which to impale the female with the paramere. In species without an externally visible ectospermalege, traumatic insemination takes place over a wide range of the body surface.

Exactly why males 'comply' with this aspect of female control over the site of mating is unclear, especially as male P. cavernis appear to be able to penetrate the abdomen at a number of points independent of the presence of an ectospermalege. One possibility is that mating outside the ectospermalege reduces female fecundity to such an extent that the mating male's paternity is significantly reduced ... The ectospermalege appears to act as a mating guide, directing the male's copulatory interest, and therefore damage, to a restricted area of the female's abdomen.

The mesospermalege is a sac attached to the inner abdomen, under the ectospermalege. Sperm is injected through the male's aedeagus into the mesospermalege. In some species, the ectospermalege directly connects to the ovaries – thus, sperm and ejaculate never enters the hemolymph and thus never trigger an immune reaction. (The exact characteristics of the spermalege vary widely across different species of bed bugs.) The spermalege are generally found only in females. However, males in the genus Afrocimex possess an ectospermalege. Sperm remains in the spermalege for approximately four hours; after two days, none remains.

Male bed bugs have evolved chemoreceptors on their aedeagi. After impaling a female, the male can "taste" if a female has been recently mated. If he does, he will not copulate as long and will ejaculate less fluid into the female.

== Use in the animal kingdom ==
Although traumatic insemination is most widely practiced among heteropterans (typical bugs), the phenomenon has been observed across a wide variety of other invertebrate taxa. These include:

- Oxyurida (nematodes) – Traumatic insemination has been observed in pinworm genera including Auchenacantha, Citellina, Passalurus, and "probably" Austroxyris.
- Acanthocephala (parasitic, thorny-headed worms) – The presence of mating plugs on the sides of Pomphorhynchus bulbocolli suggests traumatic insemination occurs in this species. Because these parasites cannot move after anchoring themselves to a host's intestine, traumatic insemination may have evolved to compensate for their immobility.
- Rotifera (wheel animalcules) – In the genus Brachionus, the male pierces the syncytial integument (equivalent to skin) and injects sperm; in Asplanchna brightwelli the male secretes an enzyme which breaks down the female integument and injects sperm through the hole.
- Turbellaria (free living flatworms) – Hermaphroditic flatworms reproduce by "penis fencing". Individuals "fence" with penises, attempting to use their penis to pierce the skin of the other and inject sperm. The 'loser' is the flatworm which is inseminated and must bear the energy costs of reproduction. One study of Pseudoceros bifurcus found "Most inseminations were unilateral. Even when reciprocal penis insertion could be achieved by the second partner, the first to inseminate obtained a longer injection time than the second." In another species, Macrostomum hystrix, the worm may also inject its sperm into its own head if other mates are not available.
- Gastropod snails
- Strepsiptera (twisted-winged parasites) – In Xenos vesparum, fertilization can occur either via extragenital ducts, or by traumatic insemination into the hemocoel.
- Drosophila (fruit flies) – Ejaculates are injected through the body wall into the genital tract, not the abdomen.
- Opisthobranchia (sea slugs) – Characterized by "repeated small injections into the dorsal surface of the partner, interrupted by synchronised circling movements", culminating in a standard genital insemination.
- Harpactea (spiders) – The male of the spider species Harpactea sadistica pierces the female's body cavity and inseminates her ovaries directly.

== Homosexual traumatic insemination ==
Traumatic insemination is not limited to male–female couplings. Male homosexual traumatic inseminations have been observed in the flower bug Xylocoris maculipennis and bed bugs of the genus Afrocimex.

In the genus Afrocimex, both species have well developed ectospermalege (but only females have a mesospermalege). The male ectospermalege is slightly different from that found in females, and amazingly enough, Carayon (1966) found that male Afrocimex bugs suffer actual homosexual traumatic inseminations. He found the male ectospermalege often showed characteristic mating scars, and histological studies showed "foreign" sperm were widely dispersed in the bodies of these homosexually mated males. Sperm cells of other males were, however, never found in or near the male reproductive tract. It therefore seems unlikely that sperm from other males could be inseminated when a male that has himself suffered traumatic insemination mates with a females. The costs and benefits, if any, of homosexual traumatic insemination in Afrocimex remain unknown.

Klaus Reinhardt of the University of Sheffield and colleagues observed two morphologically different kinds of spermalege in Afrocimex constrictus, a species in which both male and females are traumatically inseminated. They found females use sexual mimicry as a way to avoid traumatic insemination. In particular, they observed males, and females who had male spermalege structures, were inseminated less often than females with female spermalege structures.

In Xylocoris maculipennis, after a male traumatically inseminates another male, the injected sperm migrate to the testes. (The seminal fluid and most of the sperm are digested, giving the inseminated male a nutrient-rich meal.) It has been suggested, although there is no evidence, that when the inseminated male ejaculates into a female, the female receives both males' sperm.

== Interspecies traumatic insemination ==
Cases of traumatic insemination between animals of different species will sometimes provoke a possibly lethal immune reaction. A female Cimex lectularius traumatically inseminated by a male C. hemipterus will swell up at the site of insemination as the immune system responds to male ejaculates. In the process, the female's lifespan is reduced. In some cases, this immune reaction can be so massive as to be almost immediately fatal. A female Hesperocimex sonorensis will swell up, blacken, and die within 24–48 hours after being traumatically inseminated by a male H. cochimiensis.

== Similar mating practices ==
In the animal kingdom, traumatic insemination is not unique as a form of coercive sex. Research suggests that in the water beetle genus Acilius there is no courtship system between males and females. "It's a system of rape. But the females don't take things quietly. They evolve counter-weapons." Cited mating behaviors include males suffocating females underwater till exhausted, and allowing only occasional access to the surface to breathe for up to six hours (to prevent them breeding with other males), and females which have a variety of body shapes (to prevent males from gaining a grip). Foreplay is "limited to the female desperately trying to dislodge the male by swimming frantically around."

"Rape behavior" has been observed in a number of duck species. In the blue-winged teal, "rape attempts by paired males may occur at any time during the breeding season." Cited reasons for this being beneficial to the paired males include successful reproduction, and chasing away intruders from their territory. Bachelor herds of bottlenose dolphins will sometimes gang up on a female and coerce her to have sex with them, by swimming near her, chasing her if she attempts to escape, and making vocalized or physical threats. In the insect world, male water striders unable to penetrate her genital shield, will draw predators to a female until she copulates.

== See also ==
- Evolutionary arms race
- Sexual conflict
- Sexual cannibalism
