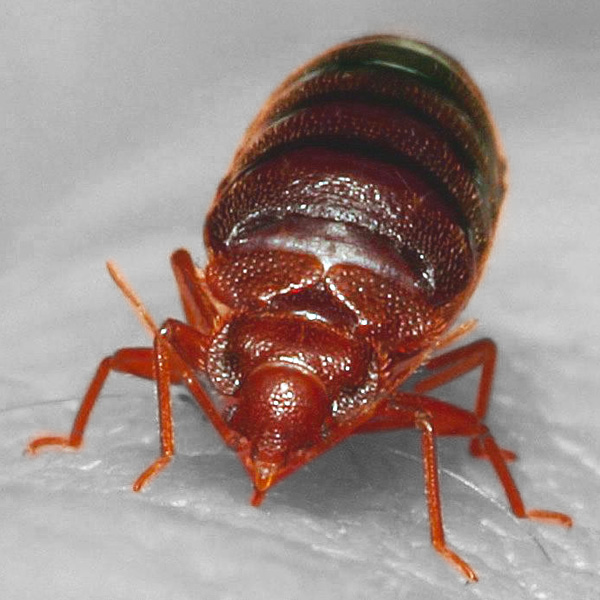
- Adult

Scientific classification
- Kingdom: Animalia
- Phylum: Arthropoda
- Clade: Pancrustacea
- Class: Insecta
- Order: Hemiptera
- Suborder: Heteroptera
- Family: Cimicidae
- Genus: Cimex
- Species: C. lectularius

Binomial name
- Cimex lectularius Linnaeus, 1758

= Cimex lectularius =

Species of true bug

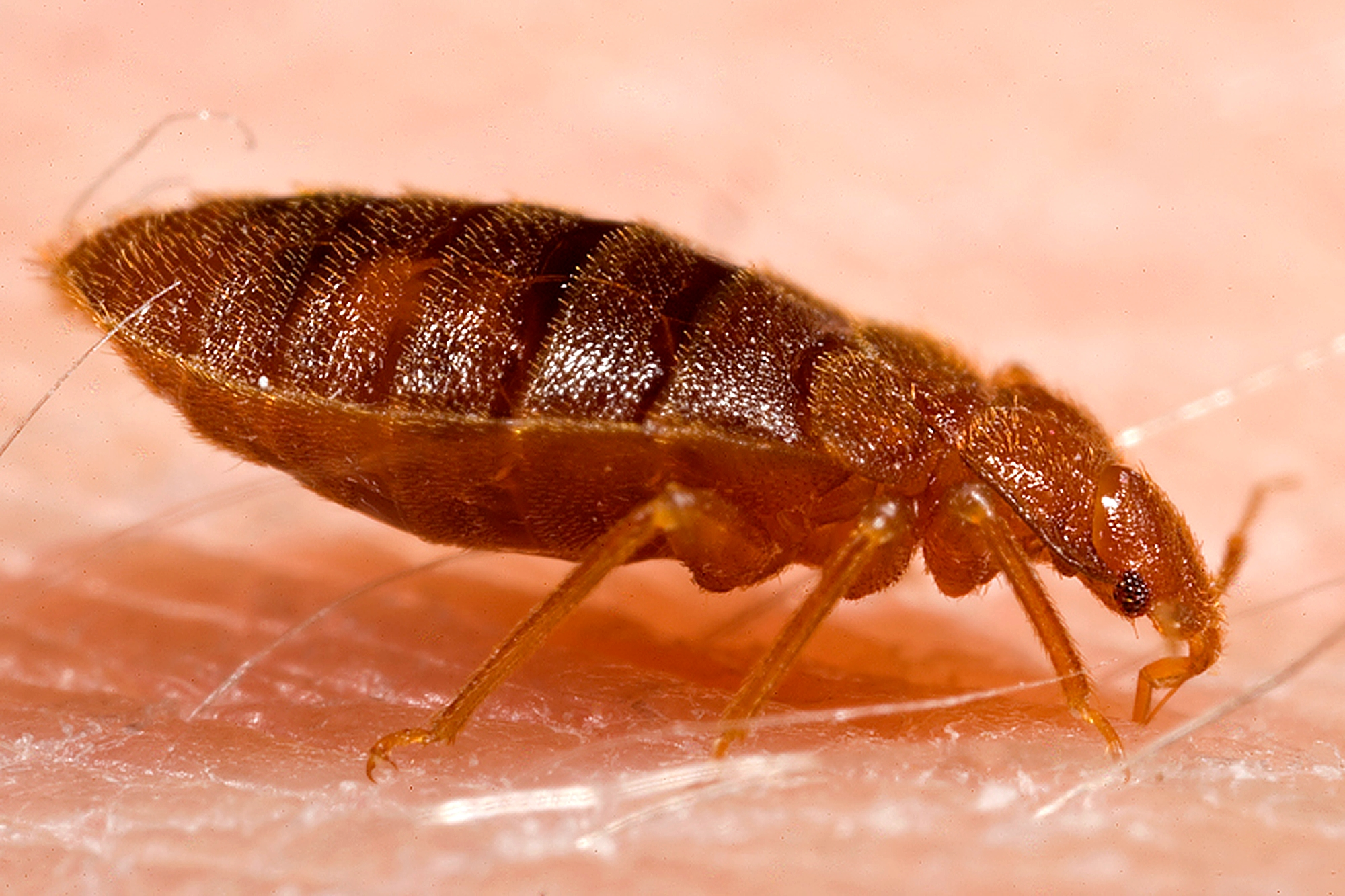
Adult

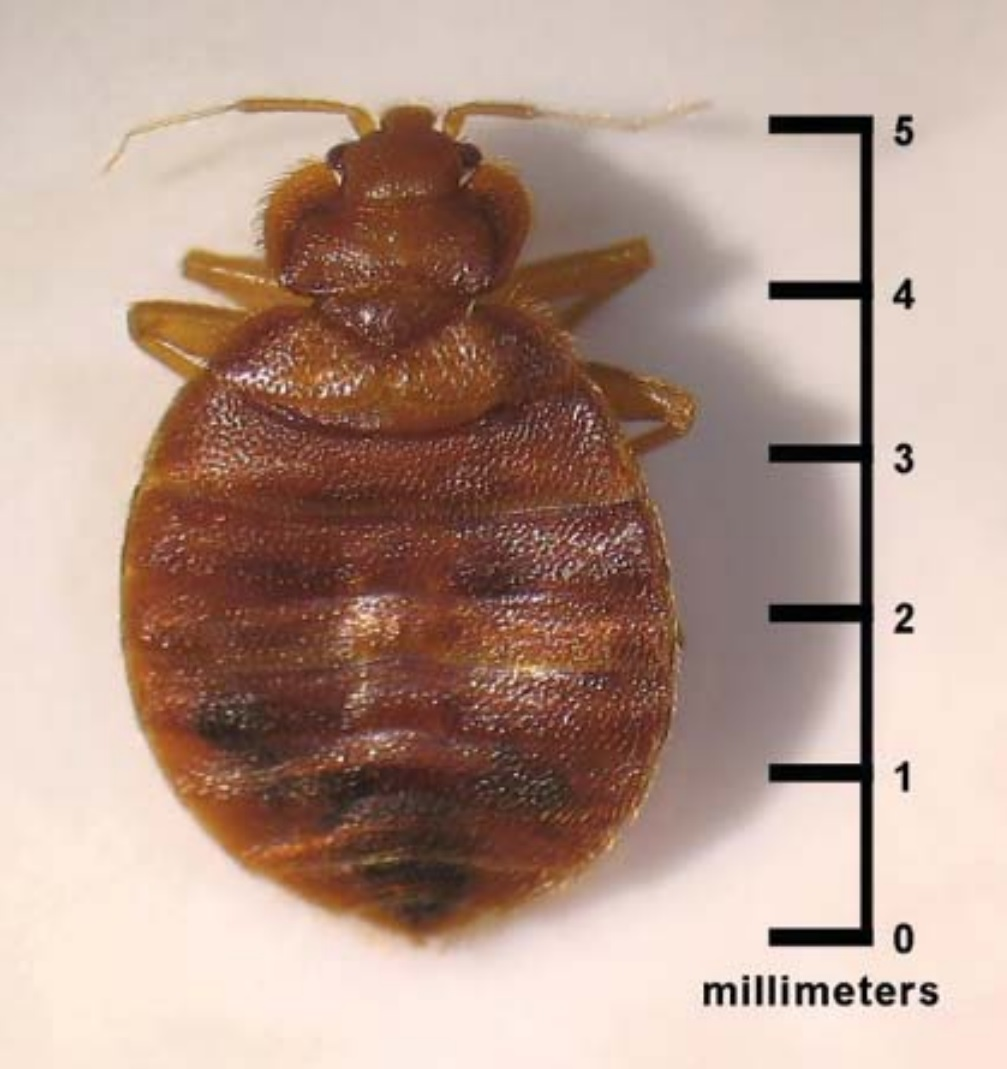
Adult

Cimex lectularius, the common bedbug, is a species of Cimicidae. An ectoparasite, its primary hosts are humans. It is one of the world's major "nuisance pests".

Although bedbugs can be infected with at least 28 human pathogens, no studies have found that the insects are capable of transmitting any of these to humans. They have been found with methicillin-resistant Staphylococcus aureus (MRSA) and with vancomycin-resistant Enterococcus faecium (VRE), but the significance of this is still unknown.

Investigations into potential transmission of HIV, MRSA, hepatitis B, hepatitis C, and hepatitis E have not shown that bedbugs can spread these diseases. However, there is some evidence that arboviruses may be transmissible.

Bedbug bites (cimicosis) may lead to a range of skin manifestations from no visible effects to prominent blisters. Effects include skin rashes, psychological effects and allergic symptoms.

== Occurrence and distribution ==
Cimex lectularius is found all over the world in almost every area that has been settled by humans. In the past, bedbugs were particularly an affliction of the poor and occurred in mass shelters. However, in the early part of the modern resurgence it was the tourist areas that were impacted. Today, bedbugs have conquered quite diverse locations, ranging from hospitals and hotels, to trains, cruise ships and even airplanes. Most commonly, bedbugs travel as stowaways in luggage, although they can be transferred via furnishing and other belongings, as well by spreading to adjoining properties. Since there are no mandatory reporting requirements, exact figures on the occurrence of bedbugs are unknown and, due to the stigma often associated, many infestations are simply not reported.

== Lifecycle ==
If feeding regularly, a female bedbug can lay between two and three eggs per day throughout her adult lifetime, which may last several months, allowing one female to produce hundreds of offspring under optimal conditions. The tiny (<1 mm) yellowish-white eggs look vase-shaped and are laid within harborages where the insects rest between bloodmeals and spend virtually all of their time; although parasitic, they do not reside either on or in their hosts, and only contact them briefly for bloodmeals. Eggs typically hatch within 10 days at room temperature, but become inviable below 14 °C (57 °F). Cimex lectularius goes through five immature lifestages that each require a bloodmeal to develop and move on to the next stage. Its lifecycle develops more swiftly at warmer temperatures, and slowlier at lower ones. Once an egg hatches, the larval form must have one bloodmeal a week as it completes each of its five or six molts. Once it completes the final molt, it will have reached the adult stage and can reproduce. Meals take several minutes to consume, and occur only under optimal surrounding conditions: darkness, warmth, and enough carbon dioxide in the air. C. lectularius typically feeds on sleeping hosts; it tends to feed exclusively on humans, being an obligate bloodsucker (also called hematophage). Newly hatched nymphs must consume a bloodmeal within two to three days lest they starve to death, whereas adults can live for as long as six months between feedings.

== Resistance ==
Some populations have evolved resistance to insecticides. Seong et al. (2010) found deltamethrin resistance provided by an allele – L925I – of the voltage gated sodium channel. They discovered also a dose–response relationship of resistance to the L925I copy number.
