= Epidemiology of bed bugs =

Topic in public health

Bed bugs occur around the world. Rates of infestations in developed countries, while decreasing from the 1930s to the 1980s, have risen dramatically since the 1980s. Previous to this, they were common in the developing world but rare elsewhere. The increase in the developed world may have been caused by the growth of international travel, resistance to insecticides, and the use of new pest control methods that do not affect bed bugs.

The fall in bed bug populations after the 1930s in the developed world is believed to be partly due to the usage of DDT to kill household pests such as cockroaches. The invention of the vacuum cleaner and simplification of furniture design may have also played a role. Others believe it might simply be the cyclical nature of the organism.

== Worldwide ==
Bed bugs are increasing in Europe, the US, Canada and Australia. The infestations have been occurring in a wide range of facilities in the developed world in recent years including: hotels (from backpacker to five star), overnight trains, private homes, cruise ships, schools, hospitals and homeless shelters. These infestations are occasionally of both types of bed bugs (common and tropical). The increased rates of infestations have been matched by increased media coverage. Pest management companies have also seen an increase in calls regarding bed bugs during the 2000s.

=== United Kingdom ===
Figures from one London borough show reported bed bug infestations doubling each year from 1995 to 2001. There is also evidence of a previous cycle of bed bug infestations in the U.K. in the mid-1980s. In 2010 the increase of infestation in UK was estimated to be around 24%. In the hot summer of 2018 it was reported that bedbug infestations had been increasing year-on-year in UK cities since 2006, with no sign of levelling off. This was considered likely to be due to increased temperatures. Bedbugs were commonly found in seats on London buses and Tube trains.

=== United States ===
Bed bugs have been reported in all 50 states. The U.S. National Pest Management Association reported a 71% increase in bed bug calls between 2000 and 2005. The Steritech Group, a pest-management company based in Charlotte, North Carolina, claimed that 25% of the 700 hotels they surveyed between 2002 and 2006 needed bed bug treatment. The resurgence led the United States Environmental Protection Agency to hold a National Bed Bug Summit in 2009.

Numbers of reported incidents in New York City rose from 500 in 2004 to 10,000 in 2009 mostly in Brooklyn area. In August 2010, bed bugs were found in the Elle Fashion Hachette building in New York City. After suspected infestation, a beagle trained in sniffing bed bugs was used to confirm their presence. Office workers were told to work from home while the building was being treated. Although largely thought to only cause problems in less maintained and dirty environments, there is an increasing incidence of bed bugs for infesting indoor environments of high maintenance standards.

One recent theory about bed bug reappearance is that they never truly disappeared from the United States, but may have been forced to alternative hosts. Consistent with this is the finding the bed bug DNA shows no evidence of an evolutionary bottleneck. Furthermore, investigators have found high populations of bed bugs at poultry facilities in Arkansas. Poultry workers at these facilities may be spreading bed bugs, unknowingly carrying them to their places of residence and elsewhere after leaving work.

In November 2016 a media report noted that tropical bed bugs, Cimex hemipterus, which had been extirpated from the state during World War II, were discovered in Brevard County, Florida, and were expected to spread in distribution within the United States.

=== Canada ===
Bed bug infestations have been becoming an increasing issue in urban environments. In a Toronto, Canada study, the mean number of treatments required per affected location was highest at dormitories, hotels, homeless shelters, and rooming houses. Suspected reasons for this increase include increasing world travel, high exchange rates of residents, reluctance to use insecticides because of concerns regarding toxicity, and insecticide resistance. 65 Toronto homeless shelters were surveyed and 31% reported past or present bed bug infestations.
