= Bed bug =

Type of insect that feeds on human blood

- Other names: Cimicosis, bedbugs
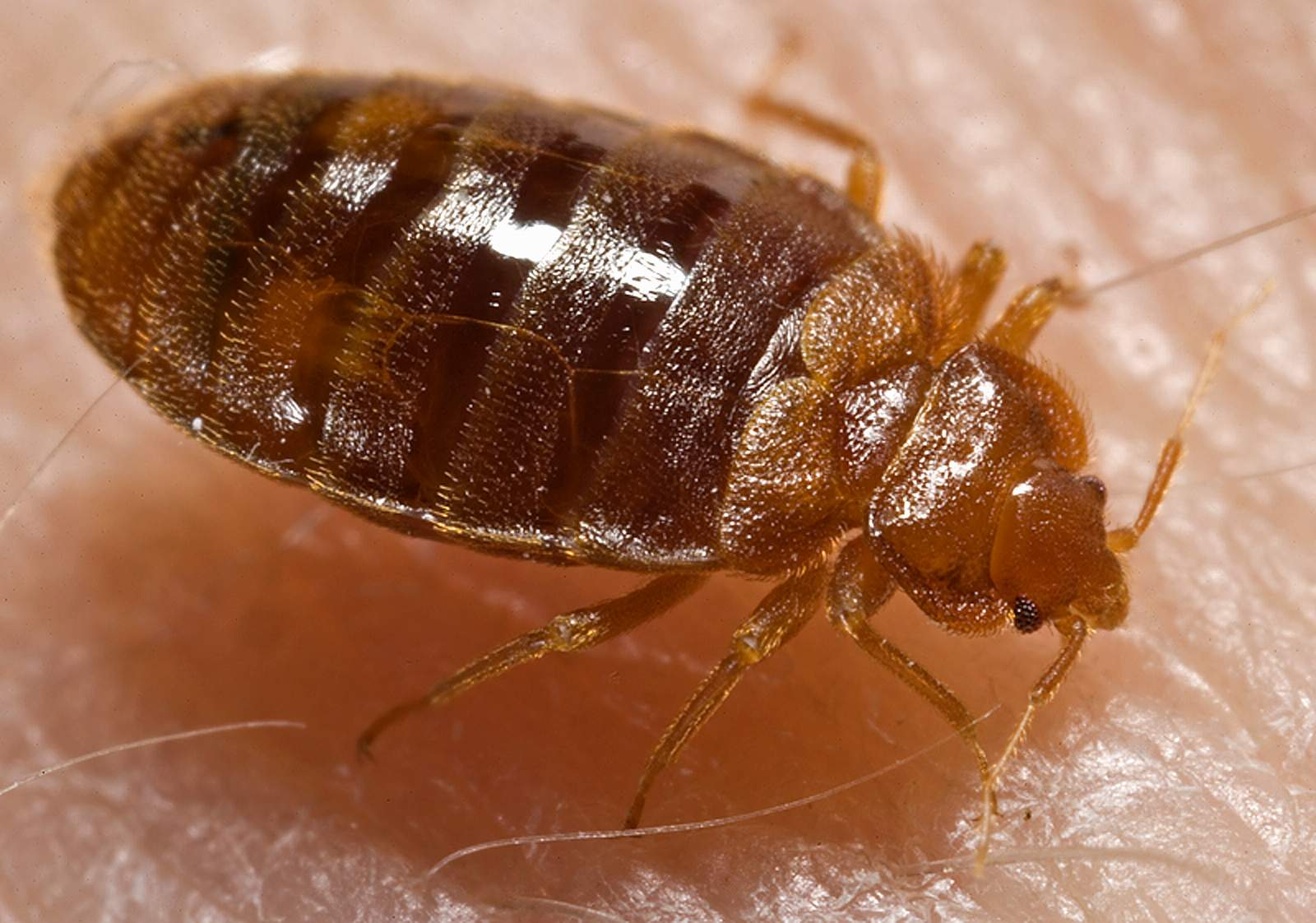
- An adult bed bug (Cimex lectularius) with the typical flattened oval shape
- Specialty: Family medicine, dermatology
- Symptoms: None to prominent blisters, itchiness
- Usual onset: Minutes to days after the bite
- Causes: Cimex (primarily Cimex lectularius and Cimex hemipterus)
- Risk factors: Travel, second-hand furnishings
- Diagnostic method: Based on finding bed bugs and symptoms
- Differential diagnosis: Allergic reaction, scabies, dermatitis herpetiformis
- Treatment: Symptomatic, bed bug eradication
- Medication: Antihistamines, corticosteroids
- Frequency: Relatively common

Bed bugs are insects from the family Cimicidae, primarily from the genus Cimex, which are parasites that feed on blood, usually at night. Their bites can result in a number of health issues, including skin rashes, psychological effects, and allergic symptoms. Bed bug bites may lead to skin changes ranging from small areas of redness to prominent blisters. Symptoms may take between minutes to days to appear and itchiness is generally present. Some individuals may feel tired or have a fever. Typically, uncovered areas of the body are affected. Their bites are not known to transmit any infectious disease. Complications may rarely include areas of dead skin or vasculitis.

Bed bug bites are caused primarily by two species of insects: Cimex lectularius (the common bed bug) and Cimex hemipterus, found primarily in the tropics. Their size ranges between 1 and 7 mm. They spread by crawling between nearby locations or by being carried within personal items. Infestation is rarely due to a lack of hygiene but is more common in high-density areas. Diagnosis involves both finding the bugs and the occurrence of compatible symptoms. Bed bugs spend much of their time in dark, hidden locations like mattress seams, or cracks in a wall.

Treatment is directed towards the symptoms. Eliminating bed bugs from the home is often difficult, partly because bed bugs can survive up to approximately 300 days without feeding. Repeated treatments of a home may be required. These treatments may include heating the room to 50 °C (122 °F) for more than 90 minutes, frequent vacuuming, washing clothing at high temperatures, the use of various pesticides., and coating the entire room with a dusting of diatomaceous earth.

Fossils found in Egypt show bed bugs have been known as human parasites for at least 3,500 years. Despite being nearly eradicated in developed countries after World War II, infestations have increased since the 1990s and bed bugs are now relatively common in all regions of the globe. Experts point to several factors that have contributed to the explosion in infestations over the last three decades: increased immigration and international travel, expanded markets for second-hand goods, a greater focus on control of other pests, the banning of certain pesticides, and increased resistance to pesticides still in use.

== Effects on humans ==
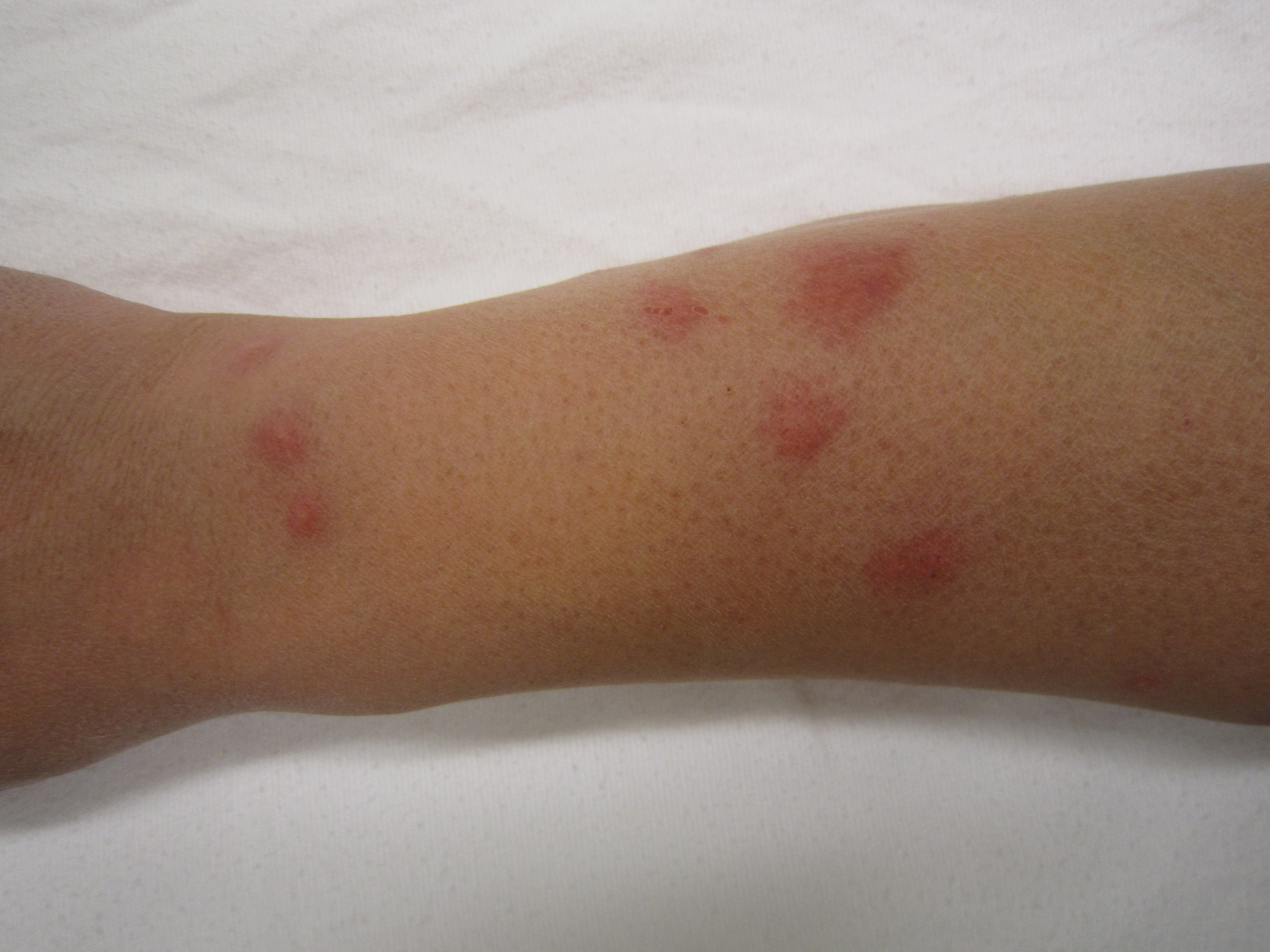
Bedbug bites

Bedbug bites

Bed bugs infest dwellings and bite people, causing irritation and sometimes other issues. There is no evidence that bed bugs transmit infectious diseases, although they appear to be capable of carrying pathogens and this possibility has been investigated.

=== Bites ===
The most common skin findings associated with bed bug bites are itching, flat and bumpy, reddish lesions. Each lesion is about 2–5 mm (0.08–0.2 in) but may be as large as 2 cm (0.8 in) in diameter and there may or may not be a central spot (punctum). Bites are usually present on areas of exposed skin, especially exposed areas not covered by sheets or blankets, such as arms, legs, feet, face or neck. Individual responses to bites vary, ranging from no visible effect (in about 20–70%), to small flat (macular) spots, to the formation of prominent blisters (wheals and bullae) along with intense itching that may last several days. Vesicles and nodules may also form. The lesions due to bites may become secondarily infected due to scratching but systemic effects from bed bug bites are very rare. A central spot of bleeding may also occur due to the release of blood thinning substances in the bug's saliva.

Symptoms may not appear until some days after the bites have occurred. Reactions often become brisker after multiple bites due to possible sensitization to the salivary proteins of the bed bug. Numerous bites may lead to a red rash or hives.

Bedbug bites may cause other symptoms and health issues. Serious allergic reactions including anaphylaxis from the injection of serum and other non-specific proteins have been documented, though rarely. As each bite takes a tiny amount of blood, chronic or severe infestation may lead to anemia. Scratching bites may lead to bacterial skin infection. Systemic poisoning may occur if the bites are numerous. The bite itself may be painful thus resulting in poor sleep and worse work performance.

Bed bugs can feed on warm-blooded animals other than humans, such as pets. The signs left by the bites are the same as in the case of people and cause identical symptoms (skin irritation, scratching etc.). Bed bugs can infest poultry sheds and cause anemia and a decrease in egg production in hens.

==== Treatment ====
Treatment of bed bug bites requires keeping the person from being repeatedly bitten, and possible symptomatic use of antihistamines and corticosteroids (either topically or systemically). Other treatments include epinephrine injections. However, there is no evidence that medications improve outcomes, and symptoms usually resolve without treatment in 1–2 weeks.

=== Other effects of infestation ===
It is possible that exposure to bed bugs may trigger an asthma attack via the effects of airborne allergens, although evidence of this association is limited.

Serious infestations and chronic attacks can cause anxiety, stress, and sleep difficulties. Development of refractory delusional parasitosis is possible, as a person develops an overwhelming obsession with bed bugs.

== Description ==
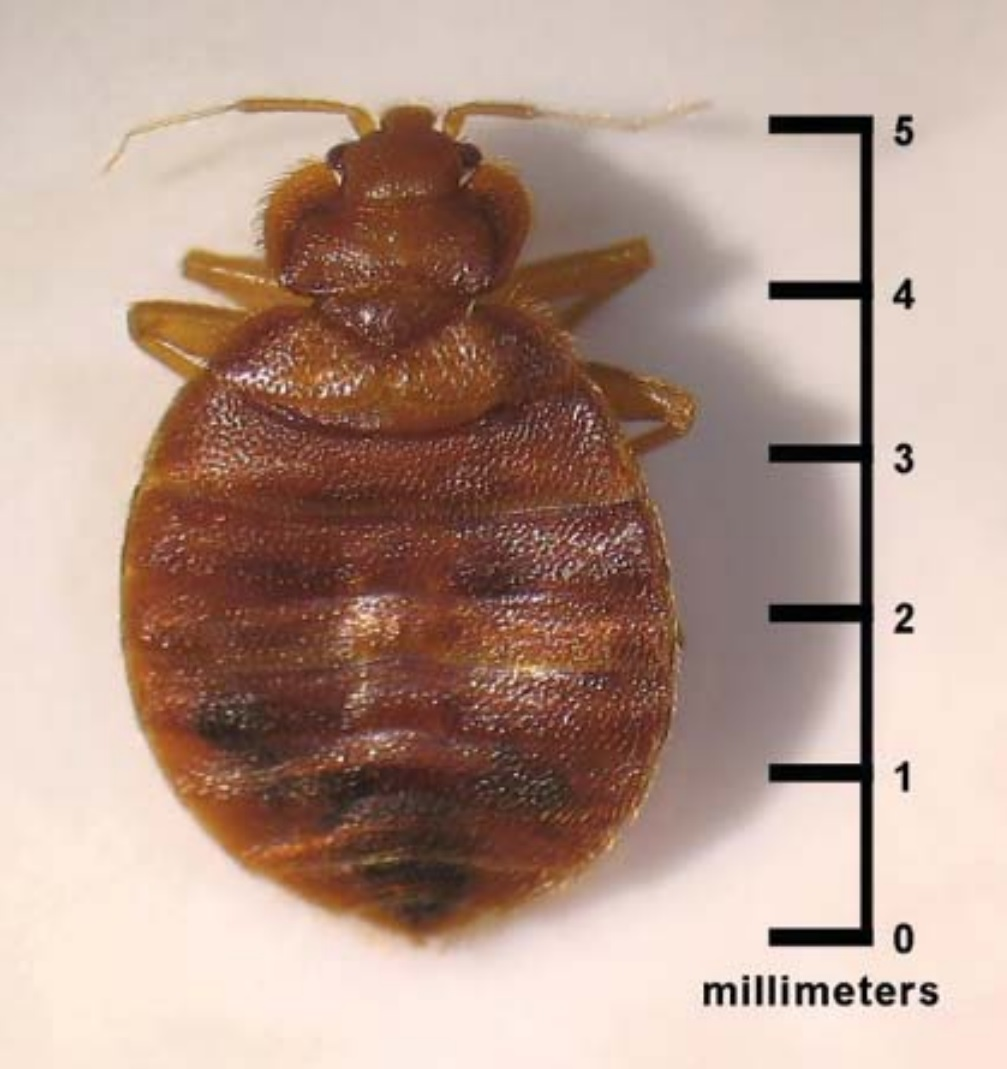
An adult bed bug is about 4 to 5 mm long.

Bed bug infestations are primarily the result of two species of insects from genus Cimex: Cimex lectularius (the common bed bug) and Cimex hemipterus (the tropical bed bug). These insects feed exclusively on blood and, at any stage of development, may survive up to 70 days without feeding. Adult Cimex are light brown to reddish-brown, flat, oval, and have no hind wings. The front wings are vestigial and reduced to pad-like structures. Adults grow to 4–5 mm (0.16–0.20 in) long and 1.5–2 mm (0.059–0.079 in) wide. Female common bed bugs can lay 1–10 eggs per day and 200–500 eggs in their lifetime, whereas female tropical bed bugs can lay about 50 eggs in their lifetime.

Bed bugs have five immature nymph life stages and a final sexually mature adult stage. Bed bugs need at least one blood meal in order to advance to the next stage of development. They shed their skins through ecdysis at each stage, discarding their outer exoskeleton. Newly hatched nymphs are translucent, lighter in color, and become browner as they moult and reach maturity. Bed bugs may be mistaken for other insects, such as booklice, small cockroaches, or carpet beetles; however, when warm and active, their movements are more ant-like, and like most other true bugs, they emit a characteristic disagreeable odor when crushed.

Bed bugs are obligatory bloodsuckers. They have mouth parts that saw through the skin and inject saliva with anticoagulants and painkillers. Sensitivity of humans varies from extreme allergic reaction to no reaction at all (about 20%). The bite usually produces a swelling with no red spot, but when many bugs feed on a small area, reddish spots may appear after the swelling subsides. Bedbugs prefer exposed skin, preferably the face, neck, and arms of a sleeping person.

Bed bugs are attracted to their hosts primarily by carbon dioxide, secondarily by warmth, and also by certain chemicals. There is strong evidence that bed bugs can respond and orient towards human odors, independently of all other host cues. Cimex lectularius feeds only every five to seven days, which suggests that it does not spend the majority of its life searching for a host. When a bed bug is starved, it leaves its shelter and searches for a host. It returns to its shelter after successful feeding or if it encounters exposure to light. Cimex lectularius aggregate under all life stages and mating conditions. Bed bugs may choose to aggregate because of predation, resistance to desiccation, and more opportunities to find a mate. Airborne pheromones are responsible for aggregations.

== Infestation ==
Infestation is rarely caused by a lack of hygiene. Transfer to new places is usually in the personal items of the human they feed upon. Dwellings can become infested with bed bugs in a variety of ways, such as:

- Bugs and eggs inadvertently brought in from other infested dwellings on a visiting person's clothing or luggage;
- Infested items (such as furniture especially beds or couches, clothing, or backpacks) brought into a home or business;
- Proximity of infested dwellings or items, if easy routes are available for travel, e.g. through ducts or false ceilings;
- Wild animals (such as bats or birds) that may also harbour bed bugs or related species such as the bat bug;
- People visiting an infested area (e.g. dwelling, means of transport, entertainment venue, or lodging) and carrying the bugs to another area on their clothing, luggage, or bodies. Bedbugs are increasingly found in air travel.

Though bed bugs will opportunistically feed on pets, they do not live or travel on the skin of their hosts, and pets are not believed to be a factor in their spread.

=== Detection ===
Knowing that symptoms are caused by bedbug bites rather than other causes requires seeking and finding the insect in the sleeping environment, as symptoms are not specific to bedbug bites. Bites by other arthropods cause similar symptoms, even the linear pattern of bites known colloquially as "breakfast, lunch and dinner bites".

Bed bugs can occur singly, but tend to congregate once established. Although strictly parasitic, they spend only a tiny fraction of their lives physically attached to hosts. Once a bed bug finishes feeding, it follows a chemical trail to return to a nearby harborage, commonly in or near beds or couches, where they live in clusters of adults, juveniles, and eggs. These places may include luggage, vehicle interiors, furniture, bedside clutter—even inside electrical sockets or laptop computers. Bed bugs may also lodge near animals that have nested within a dwelling, such as bats, birds, or rodents. They can also survive by feeding on domestic cats and dogs, though humans are the preferred host of C. lectularius.

A severe bedbug infestation can be detected by their characteristic pungent sweet smell, which has been described as like rotting raspberries. Bed bug detection dogs are trained to pinpoint infestations, with a possible accuracy rate between 11% and 83%.

Homemade detectors have been developed. Bedbug detectors, often referred to as "monitors", "traps" or "interceptors", use the lactic acid or carbon dioxide associated with the presence of a human body, or pheromones, to attract and trap bugs in a container. Bedbug detectors can confirm an infestation, but do not trap enough for eradication.

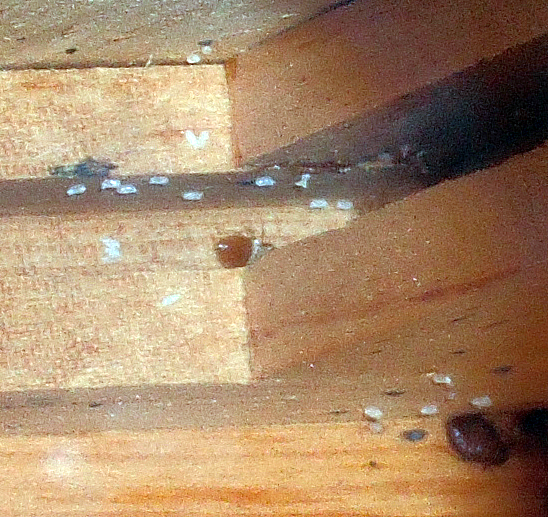
Eggs and two adults found inside a dresser

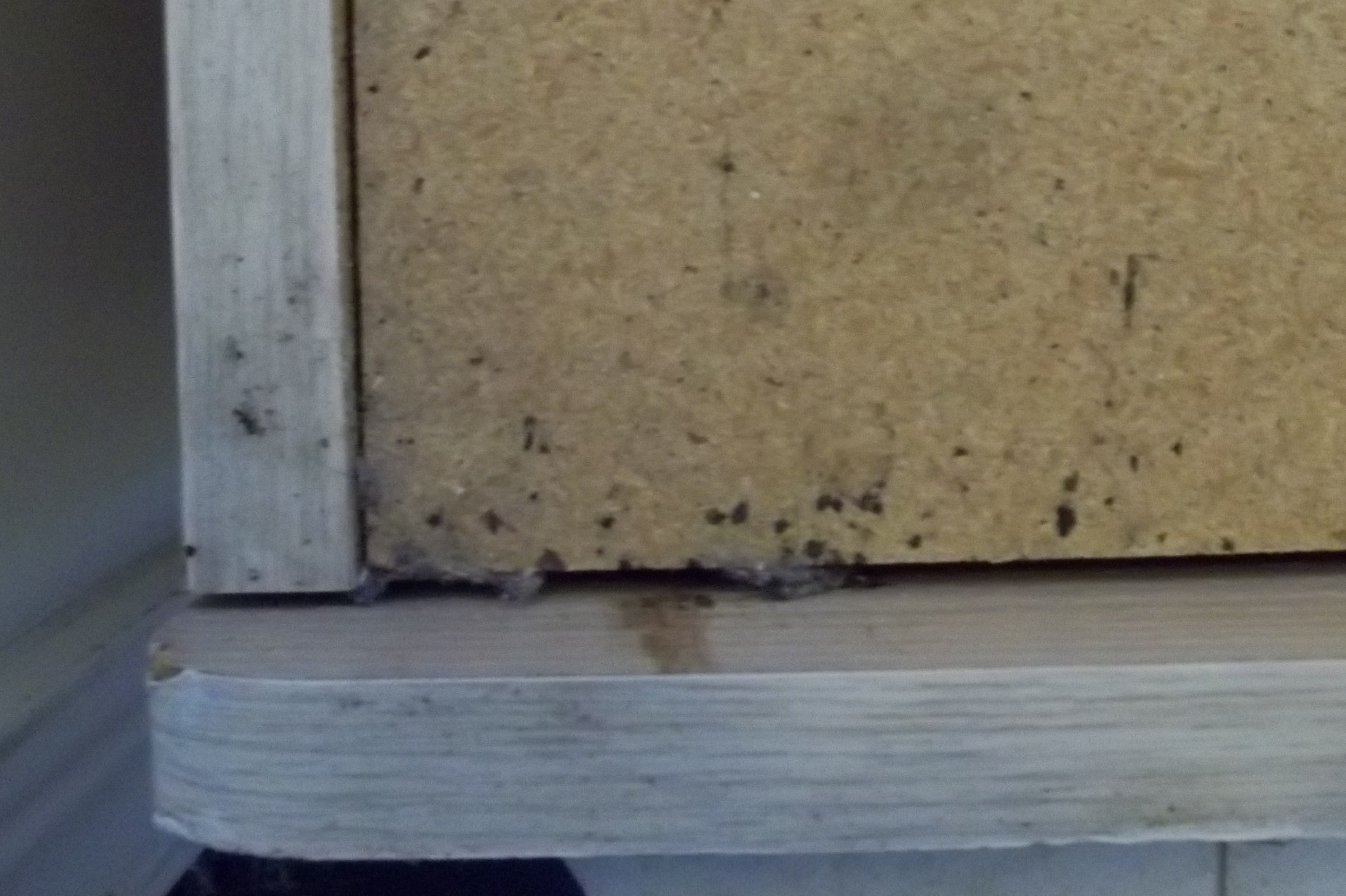
Fecal spot

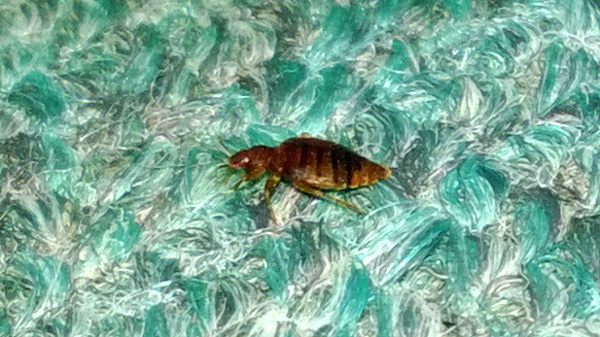
Bed bug on carpet

==== Differential detection ====
Other conditions which produce symptoms similar to bedbug bites include scabies, gamasoidosis, allergic reactions, mosquito bites, spider bites, flea bites (pulicosis), chicken pox, and bacterial skin infections.

=== Prevention ===
To prevent bringing home bed bugs from outside the home, people are advised to take precautions after visiting an infested site or traveling on means of transport that may be infested; precautions include checking shoes on leaving the site, changing clothes outside the house before entering, and putting the used clothes in a clothes dryer outside the house. When visiting a new lodging, it is advised to check the bed before taking suitcases into the sleeping area, and putting the suitcase on a raised stand to make bedbugs less likely to crawl in. Clothes should be hung up or left in the suitcase rather than left on the floor. Additional preventative measures include sealing cracks and crevices (where bed bugs often hide), inspecting furniture, and decontaminating clothes and luggage upon returning home. The founder of a company dedicated to bedbug extermination said that 5% of hotel rooms he booked into were infested. He advised people never to sit down on public transport; to check office chairs, plane seats, and hotel mattresses; and to monitor and vacuum home beds once a month. Close all wall openings or gaps; bed bugs tend to hide in dark places such as cracks in walls. Second-hand furnishings may harbour bedbugs.

=== Management ===
Avoiding repeated bites can be difficult since it usually requires eradicating bed bugs from a home or workplace; eradication is most effective using non-chemical control methods. Non-chemical control methods include vacuuming carpet and furniture (often with scraping) into a disposable bag which is then sealed into a plastic bag to prevent re-infestation. Other methods include removing textile materials from an area and washing them in hot water (at least 60 degrees Celsius) or freezing them at −20 °C (−4 °F). Most consumer-grade freezers are suitable for this method, provided the contaminated items are kept at low-enough temperatures for a long-enough time; Olson et al recommend 35 hours in a domestic freezer.

Unremovable textiles such as mattresses can be steamed to at least 60 °C (140 °F) and this method can penetrate deep into the textile to effectively kill bed bugs in, potentially, under one minute. Heating tents or chambers can be used for infested materials or entire rooms can be heated to at least 55 °C (131 °F) to effectively eradicate infestation.

There is no evidence to indicate that a combination of non-chemical methods plus insecticides is more effective than non-chemical methods alone with regards to eradication of bed bug infestations.

Insecticides are mostly ineffective for the eradication of bedbug infestations as most bedbugs are resistant to insecticides, including pyrethroids which are found in approximately 90% of commercial grade insecticides. Furthermore, insect foggers (known as "bug bombs") are ineffective in the eradication of bed bug infestation as they are unable to penetrate bed bug harborages. Resistance to pesticides has increased significantly over time, and there are concerns about harm to health from their use.

Once established, bed bugs are extremely difficult to get rid of, particularly in buildings with multiple dwellings, as they may be present in other parts of the building than the dwelling being treated, and can re-establish populations by moving from infested to decontaminated areas.

Mechanical approaches, such as vacuuming up the insects and heat-treating or wrapping mattresses, are effective. An hour at a temperature of 45 °C (113 °F) or over, or two hours at less than −17 °C (1 °F) kills them. This may include a domestic clothes drier for fabric or a commercial steamer. Bed bugs and their eggs will die on contact when exposed to surface temperatures above 180 °F (82 °C) and a steamer can reach well above 230 °F (110 °C). A study found 100% mortality rates for bed bugs exposed to temperatures greater than 50 °C (122 °F) for more than 2 minutes. The study recommended maintaining temperatures of above 48 °C (118 °F) for more than 20 min to effectively kill all life stages of bed bugs, and because in practice treatment times of 6 to 8 hours are used to account for cracks and indoor clutter. This method is expensive and has caused fires. Starving bedbugs is not effective, as they can survive without eating for 135 to 300 days, depending on temperature.

After the withdrawal of most organochlorine insecticides, it was stated in 2012 that no truly effective insecticides were available. Insecticides that have historically been found effective include pyrethroids, dichlorvos, and malathion. Resistance to pesticides has increased significantly in recent decades. The carbamate insecticide propoxur is highly toxic to bed bugs, but it has potential toxicity to children exposed to it, and the US Environmental Protection Agency has been reluctant to approve it for indoor use. Boric acid, sometimes applied as a safe indoor insecticide against pests such as cockroaches and termites, is not effective against bed bugs because they do not groom.

== Distribution ==
Bed bugs are found everywhere in the world. Before the 1950s about 30% of houses in the United States had bedbugs; this percentage has fallen, which is believed to be partly due to the use of DDT to kill cockroaches. The invention of the vacuum cleaner and simplification of furniture design may have also played a role in the decrease.

However, rates of infestation in developed countries have increased dramatically since the 1980s. This is thought to be due to greater foreign travel; increased immigration from the developing world to the developed world; more frequent exchange of second-hand furnishings among homes; a greater focus on control of other pests, resulting in neglect of bed bug countermeasures; and the banning of effective pesticides coupled with increased resistance to those pesticides still permitted. The decrease in cockroach populations due to insecticide use may have aided bed bugs' resurgence, since cockroaches eat bedbugs. Increasing resistance to DDT and other potent pesticides may have also contributed, along with bans on DDT.

The U.S. National Pest Management Association reported a 71% increase in bed bug calls between 2000 and 2005. The number of reported incidents in New York City alone rose from 500 in 2004 to 10,000 in 2009. In 2013 Chicago was listed as the US city with most bedbug infestation. In response the Chicago City Council passed a bed bug control ordinance to limit spread. Additionally, bed bugs are reaching places in which they never established before, such as southern South America.

The rise in infestations has been hard to track because bed bug infestation is not an easily identifiable problem, and those affected are not inclined to talk about it. Most reports have been collected from pest-control companies, local authorities, and hotel chains, and the problem may be more severe than is currently believed from reports.

== Species ==
The common bed bug (Cimex lectularius) is the species best adapted to human environments but is also known from birds, Chiroptera, Gallus (chickens and relatives), Myotis myotis, and sheep (Ovis aries). It is found in temperate climates throughout the world. Other species include C. hemipterus, found in tropical regions, which also infests poultry (including Gallus) and bats, and Leptocimex boueti, a relative of C. lectularius adapted for the tropics of West Africa and South America, which infests bats and humans. C. pilosellus and C. pipistrella primarily infest bats, while Haematosiphon inodora, a species of North America, primarily infests poultry.

== Evolution ==
Cimicidae, the ancestor of modern bed bugs, first emerged approximately 115 million years ago, more than 55 million years before bats—their previously presumed initial host—first appeared. From unknown ancestral hosts, a variety of different lineages evolved which specialized in either bats or birds. The common (C. lectularius) and tropical bed bug (C. hemipterus) split 40 million years before Homo evolution. Humans became hosts to bed bugs through host specialist extension (rather than switching) on three separate occasions.

== Historical reports ==
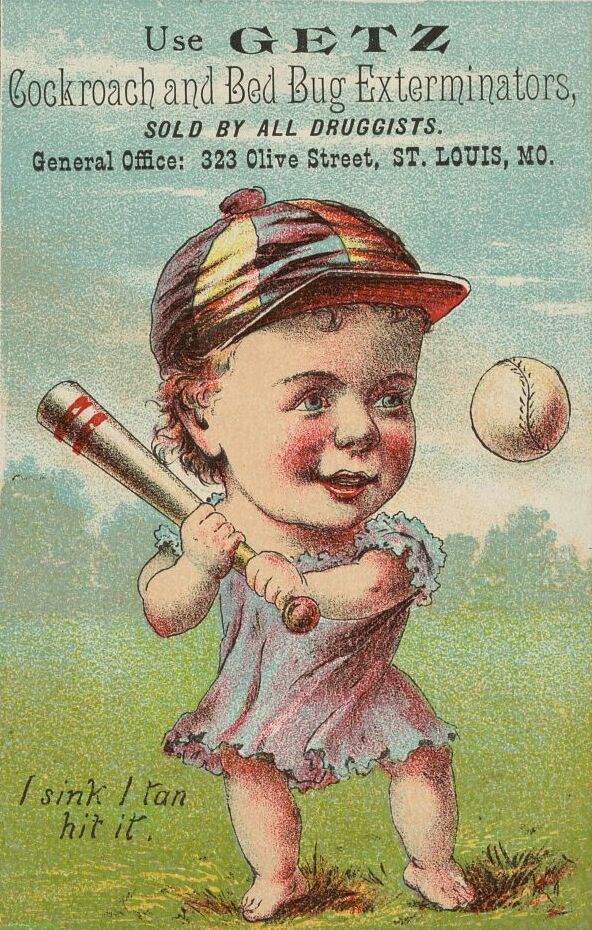
1870s–1890s advertisement for a bed bug exterminator. It reads "Use Getz cockroach and bed bug exterminators, sold by all druggists."

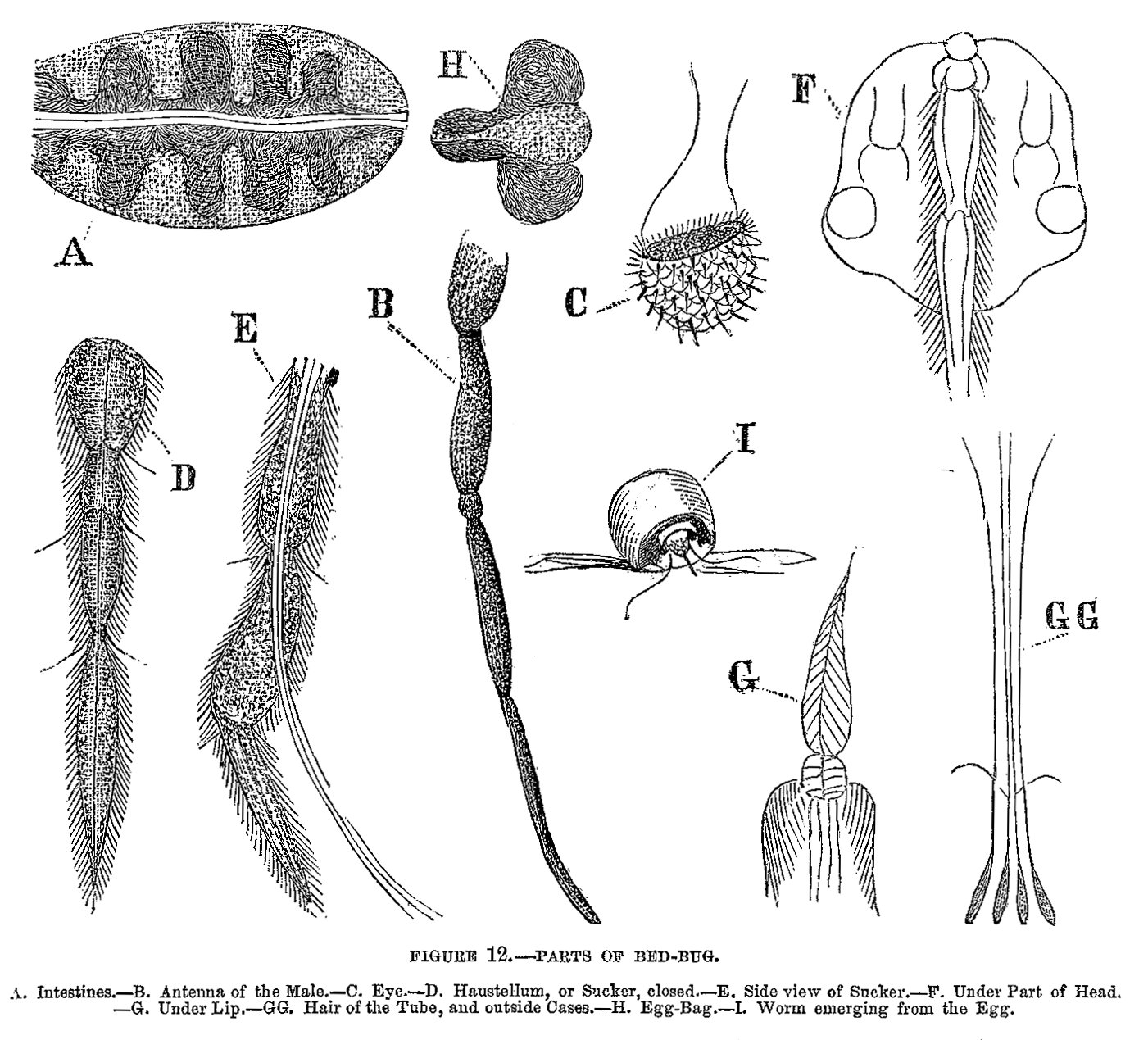
1860 engraving of bed bug parts: A. Intestines – B. Antenna of the male – C. Eye – D. Haustellum, or sucker, closed – E. Side view of sucker – F. Under part of head – G. Under lip – GG. Hair of the tube, and outside cases – H. Egg-bag – I. Larva emerging from the eggs

Bed bugs were first mentioned in ancient Greece as early as 400 BC, and later by Aristotle. Pliny's Natural History, first published c. 77 AD in Rome, claimed bed bugs had medicinal value in treating ailments such as snake bites and ear infections. Belief in the medicinal use of bed bugs persisted until at least the 18th century, when Guettard recommended their use in the treatment of hysteria.

Bed bugs were also mentioned in Germany in the 11th century, in France in the 13th century, and in England in 1583, though they remained rare in England until 1670. Some in the 18th century believed bed bugs had been brought to London with supplies of wood to rebuild the city after the Great Fire of London (1666). Giovanni Antonio Scopoli noted their presence in Carniola (roughly equivalent to present-day Slovenia) in the 18th century.

Traditional methods of repelling or killing bed bugs include the use of plants, fungi, and insects (or their extracts), such as black pepper; black cohosh (Actaea racemosa); Pseudarthria hookeri; Laggera alata (Chinese yángmáo cǎo | 羊毛草); Eucalyptus saligna oil; henna (Lawsonia inermis or camphire); "infused oil of Melolontha vulgaris" (presumably cockchafer); fly agaric (Amanita muscaria); tobacco; "heated oil of Terebinthina" (i.e. true turpentine); wild mint (Mentha arvensis); narrow-leaved pepperwort (Lepidium ruderale); Myrica spp. (e.g. bayberry); Robert geranium (Geranium robertianum); bugbane (Cimicifuga spp.); "herb and seeds of Cannabis"; "opulus" berries (possibly maple or European cranberrybush); masked hunter bugs (Reduvius personatus), "and many others".

In the mid-19th century, smoke from peat fires was recommended as an indoor domestic fumigant against bed bugs.

Dusts have been used to ward off insects from grain storage for centuries, including plant ash, lime, dolomite, certain types of soil, and diatomaceous earth or Kieselguhr. Of these, diatomaceous earth in particular has seen a revival as a non-toxic (when in amorphous form) residual pesticide for bed bug abatement. While diatomaceous earth often performs poorly, silica gel may be effective.

Basket-work panels were put around beds and shaken out in the morning in the UK and in France in the 19th century. Scattering leaves of plants with microscopic hooked hairs around a bed at night, then sweeping them up in the morning and burning them, was a technique reportedly used in Southern Rhodesia and in the Balkans.

Bean leaves have been used historically to trap bedbugs in houses in Eastern Europe. The trichomes on the bean leaves capture the insects by impaling the feet (tarsi) of the insects. The leaves are then destroyed.

=== 20th century ===
Until the mid-20th century, bed bugs were very common. According to a report by the UK Ministry of Health, in 1933, all the houses in many areas had some degree of bed bug infestation. The increase in bed bug populations in the early 20th century has been attributed to the advent of electric heating, which allowed bed bugs to thrive year-round instead of only in warm weather.

Bed bugs were a serious problem at US military bases during World War II. Initially, the problem was solved by fumigation, using Zyklon Discoids that released hydrogen cyanide gas, a rather dangerous procedure. Later, DDT was used to good effect, though bedbugs have since become largely resistant to it.

The decline of bed bug populations in the 20th century is often credited to potent pesticides that had not previously been widely available. Other contributing factors that are less frequently mentioned in news reports are increased public awareness and slum clearance programs that combined pesticide use with steam disinfection, relocation of slum dwellers to new housing, and in some cases also follow-up inspections for several months after relocated tenants moved into their new housing.

=== 21st century ===
In 2010, bed bug infestations were reported in New York houses, retail stores, cinemas, offices and schools, especially in Brooklyn and Queens. In early 2023, Orkin reported that Chicago, New York, Philadelphia, Cleveland and Los Angeles were the top five cities in the United States with most bed bug infestations.

In France, these insects re-emerged, despite having disappeared from daily life in the 1950s, due to nomadic lifestyles, consumption of second-hand purchases, and bugs' resistance to insecticides, in addition to increased traveling and tourism following the COVID-19 lockdowns. Between 2017 and 2022, 11% of French households were infested by bed bugs, according to a report from the National Agency for Food, Environmental and Occupational Health Safety (ANSES). In the middle of 2023, reports emerged of a bed bug infestation spread in the capital city of Paris, when it was first seen in cinemas, then it expanded to homes, trains, schools and even hospitals. Treatment of this outbreak has cost France an estimated €230m annually. In the meantime, the United Kingdom witnessed a 65% increase in year-on-year infestations across the country, according to Rentokil. In November 2023, it was reported that South Korea was experiencing a bed bug infestation.

In late November 2025 it was reported that the Cinémathèque Française in Paris had to close its four screening halls for a month due to an infestation of bedbugs.

== Society and culture ==
"Don't let the bedbugs bite" is a phrase still in modern use.

=== Legal action ===
Bed bugs are an increasing cause for litigation. Courts have, in some cases, exacted large punitive damage judgments on some hotels. Many of New York City's Upper East Side homeowners have been afflicted, but they tend to remain publicly silent in order not to ruin their property values and be seen as suffering a blight typically associated with "lower social class." Local Law 69 in New York City requires owners of buildings with three or more units to provide their tenants and potential tenants with reports of bedbug history in each unit. They must also prominently post these listings and reports in their building.
