= NPMA =

NPMA may refer to:

- 16S rRNA (adenine1408-N1)-methyltransferase, an enzyme
- National Pest Management Association, an American non-profit organization
