= KAMB =

Kamb may refer to:

- Kamb, Southern Highlands Province, a village in Papua-New Guinea
- Kamb, Western Finland Province, Finland
- Kamb, Louga, Senegal
- Kamb, on the Cap-Vert peninsula in Senegal

KAMB may refer to:

- KAMB (FM), a radio station (101.5 FM) licensed to serve Merced, California
- 16S rRNA (adenine1408-N1)-methyltransferase, an enzyme
- Kobolds Ate My Baby!, a role-playing game
