= 2023 Paris bedbug infestation =

Bedbug outbreak in France

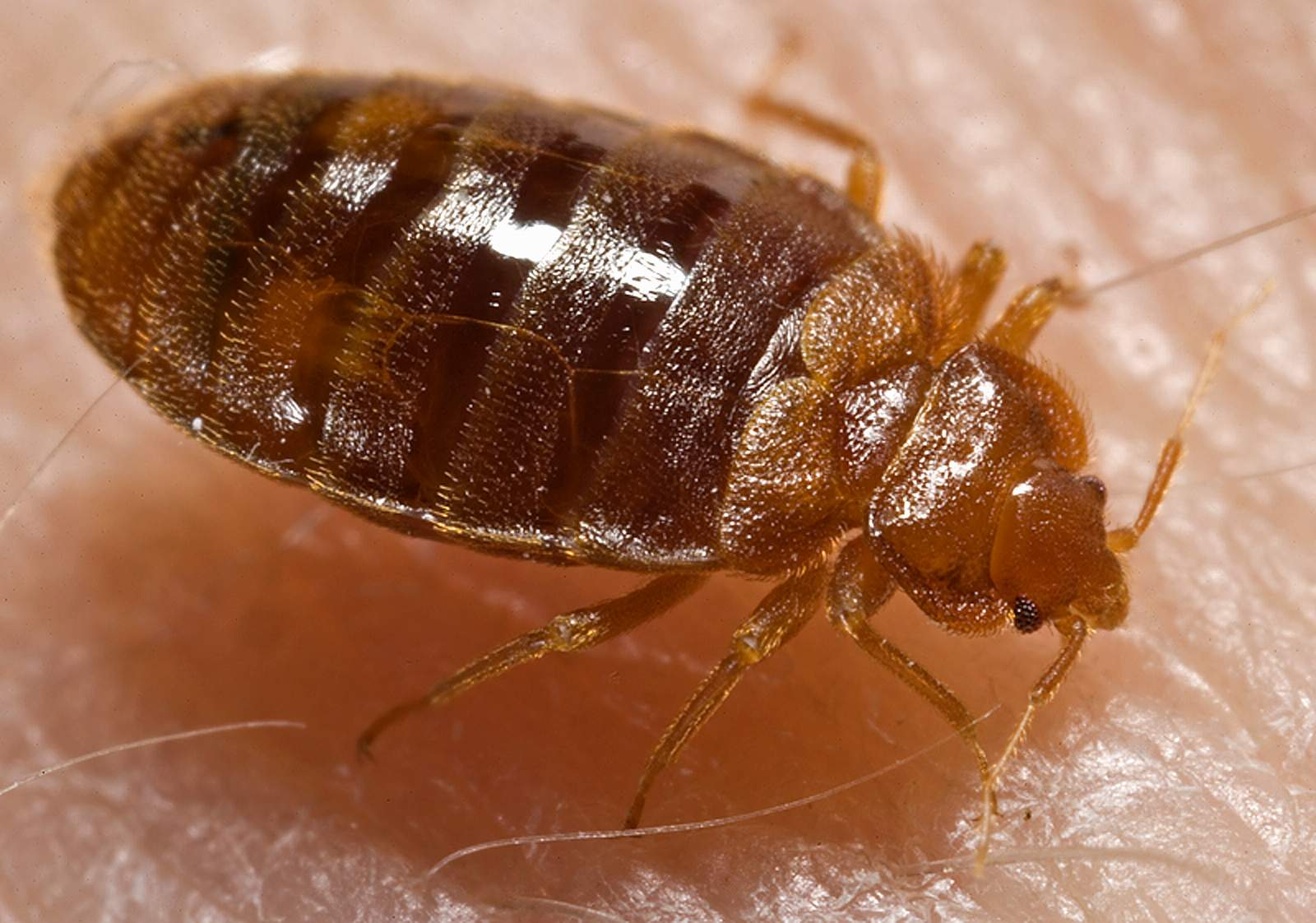
The common bed bug is found worldwide. Infestations are common in the developing world, especially occurring in crowded settings.

The 2023 Paris bedbug outbreak was a local infestation of bedbugs that took place in the French capital in the latter half of 2023. Reports of bedbug sightings began in rental and hotel accommodations in the summer of 2023, and escalated to public spaces, including movie theaters and transport systems, over the following months. The outbreak caused national upset and drew significant media attention, with both local and international actors calling on the French government for a more serious response to the situation. This outbreak occurred less than a year before the start of the 2024 Summer Olympics in Paris, raising concerns about the city's ability to safely host tourists and locals traveling for the occasion.

== History ==
=== Previous bedbug infestations in France ===
Bedbug infestations have been reported as early as the times of the Ancient Greeks, but were largely eradicated in the mid-20th century thanks to the development of strong pesticides, such as DDT. A resurgence of bedbug infestations occurred in the late 1990s and has continued to evolve since then. The Stockholm Convention on Persistent Organic Pollutants signed in 2004 is cited as one of the causes for this change, as the banning of powerful pesticides led to a proliferation of this parasite. Globalization and more frequent international travel is also frequently cited as a cause.

According to a report published by the French Agency for Food, Environmental and Occupational Health & Safety (ANSES) in July 2023, more than 1 in 10 French households was infested with bedbugs between 2017 and 2022. A different estimate placed France's peak infestation at 32% households in 2019, and the figures lowered in 2020 with the onset of the Coronavirus pandemic and global travel restrictions.

=== Initial sightings and "Mass Hysteria" ===
Following the publication of the ANSES report in July 2023, French media outlets began reporting more frequently on the presence of bedbugs in households and public spaces. Videos of bedbugs in Paris public transport, trains and cinemas began circulating on social media in the beginning of October 2023. According to entomologist Jean-Michel Berenger, the presence of bedbugs in public spaces has been trending upwards, but a new element of "general psychosis" took hold in 2023. According to Berenger, bedbugs have been making a comeback for years and have been trending up on a global scale.

== Consequences and implications ==
=== Government response and measures ===
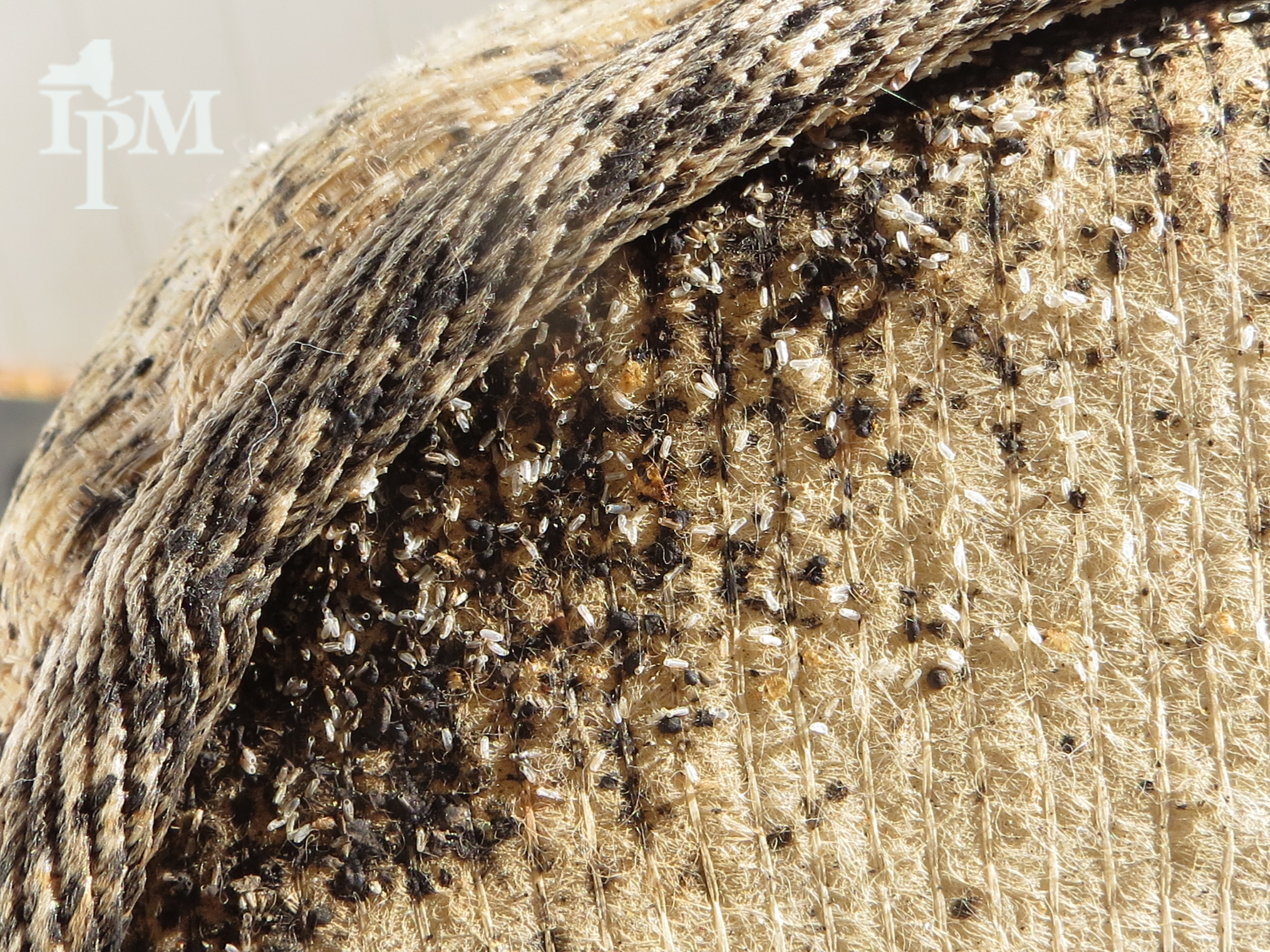
Bedbug home infestations typically occur in mattresses and couches. Bedbugs are nocturnal pests that hide in the daylight and leave their hiding spots at night to find a host.

On September 28, 2023, deputy mayor of Paris Emmanuel Grégoire asked the government to declare bedbugs a national health crisis. During a crisis meeting held on October 4, 2023, French Transport Minister Clément Beaune addressed reports of bedbug infestations in Parisian public transport and trains and claimed that of the more than 40 reported cases, "zero [were] proven". Following measures were mainly efforts to reassure Parisians and tourists that the issue was less severe than reported in news outlets through the creation of informational websites and reassurances that the issue was being dealt with seriously.

=== Cost and class divide ===
According to the 2023 ANSES report, the eradication of bedbugs cost French households 230 million euros between 2017 and 2022. In 2023, the average cost to exterminate bedbugs in Paris was estimated to be around 1200 euros per household. Although bedbugs are not more likely to begin spreading in low-income communities, the cost of eradication is cited as a reason why disadvantaged communities often face longer-lasting infestations. Some French newspapers cited the psychological cost of bedbugs infestations as weighing more heavily on low-income communities, as they have helped perpetuate stereotypes of uncleanliness and division between classes.
