= Bed bug control techniques =

Methods to prevent bed bug infestations

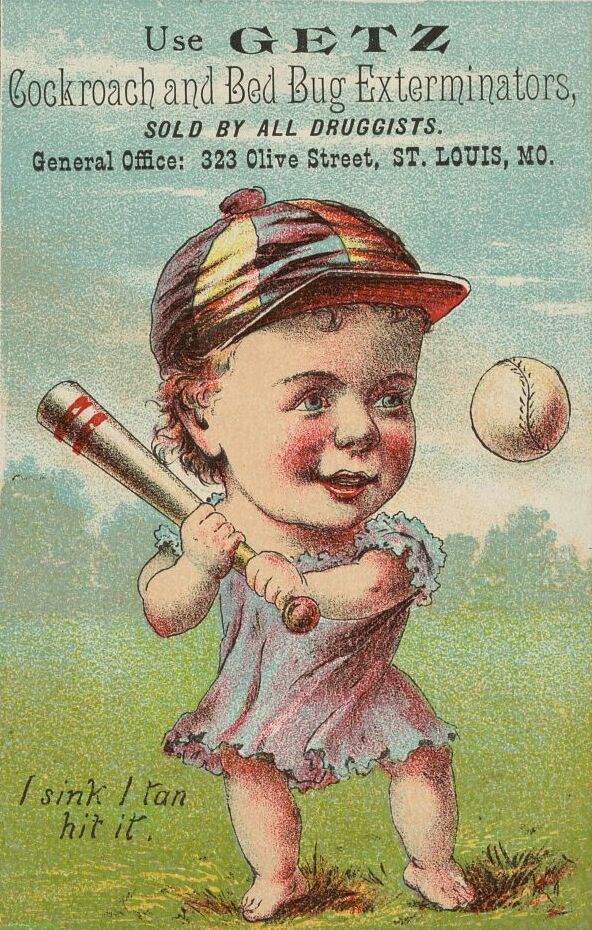
1870s–1890s advertisement for a bed bug exterminator. It reads "Use Getz cockroach and bed bug exterminators, sold by all druggists."

Bed bugs, or Cimicidae, are small parasitic insects. The term parasitic usually refers to species that prefer to feed on human blood.

Early detection and treatment are critical to successful control. According to a survey, the most commonly infested places are the mattress (98.2%), boxspring (93.6%), as well as nearby carpets and baseboards (94.1%). In fact, bed bugs thrive in areas where there is an adequate supply of available hosts, and plenty of cracks and harborages within 1.5 metres (4.9 ft) of the host.

Because treatments are required in sleeping areas and other sensitive locations, methods other than chemical pesticides are in demand. Treatments can be costly, laborious, time consuming, repetitive, and embarrassing, and may entail health risks.

== Public health laws ==
Bed bug infestations spread easily in connecting units and have negative effects on psychological well-being and housing markets. In response, many areas have specific laws about responsibilities upon discovering a bed bug infestation, particularly in hotels and multi-family housing units, because an unprofessional level of response can have the effect of prolonging the invisible part of the infestation and spreading it to nearby units.

Common laws include responsibilities such as the following: Lessors must educate all lessees about bed bugs, lessee must immediately notify lessor in writing upon discovery of infestation, lessor must not intentionally lease infested unit, lessee must not intentionally introduce infested items, lessor must eradicate the infestation immediately every time it occurs at a professional level including all connecting units, and lessee must cooperate in the eradication process.

In a 2015 survey, reports of bed bug infestation in social media lowered the value of a hotel room by $38 for business travelers and $23 for leisure travelers. Orkin surveyed 100 U.S. hotels in 2016 and found that 82% had been treated for bedbugs in the previous year.

Mapped bed bug reports graphically illustrate how difficult it can be to eliminate bed bugs in densely populated areas where many people live in adjacent units like in New York City, Los Angeles, and San Francisco.

== Pesticides ==
Though commonly used, the pesticide approach often requires multiple visits and may not always be effective due to pesticide resistance and dispersal of the bed bugs. According to a 2005 survey, only 6.1% of companies claim to be able to eliminate bed bugs in a single visit, while 62.6% claim to be able to control a problem in 2–3 visits. Insecticide application may cause dispersal of bed bugs to neighbouring areas of a structure, spreading the infestation.

Furthermore, the problem of insecticide resistance in bed bug populations increases their opportunity to spread. Studies of bed bug populations across the United States indicate that resistance to pyrethroid insecticides, which are used in the majority of bed bugs cases, is widespread. Exterminators often require individuals to dispose of furniture and other infested materials because the pesticides are ineffective. It is advisable to break or mark these infested items to prevent their being unintentionally recycled and furthering the spread of bed bugs.

=== Effectiveness ===
The well-established resistance of bed bugs to DDT and pyrethroids has created a need for different and newer chemical approaches to the extermination of bed bugs. In 2008 a study was conducted on bed bug resistance to a variety of both old and new insecticides, with the following results, listed in order from most- to least-effective: λ-cyhalothrin, bifenthrin, carbaryl, imidacloprid, fipronil, permethrin, diazinon, spinosyn, dichlorvos, chlorfenapyr, and DDT. Pyrethrin has also been registered for use against bed bugs. Note that the first of these, λ-cyhalothrin, is itself a pyrethroid-based insecticide— in the past it has been used principally for the treatment of cotton crops and so bed bugs have not yet developed a genetic resistance to it.

Up until the 1990s chlorpyrifos was used as an agent with longterm effect, but the EC biocide declaration 98/8 prohibited the use from August 2008 onward.

Some manufacturers also offer fumigants containing sulfuryl fluoride.

=== Disadvantages ===
Non-residue methods of treatment such as steaming and vacuuming are preferable to the contamination of mattresses, pillows and bed covers with insecticides. The possible health effects of pesticides on people and pets ranging from allergic reactions to cancer and acute neurotoxicity have to be considered, as well as the dispersal of bed bugs to neighbouring dwellings due to repellent effects of insecticides.

Bed bugs prefer to hide in and around the bed frame but it can still be a good idea to put a tight cotton cover on mattress and bedding to prevent access.

=== Pesticide resistance ===
Bed bugs are largely resistant to various pesticides including DDT and organophosphates. Most populations have developed a resistance to pyrethroid insecticides. Although now often ineffective, the resistance to pyrethroid allows for new chemicals that work in different ways to be investigated, so chemical management can continue to be one part in the resolving of bed bug infestations. There is growing interest in both synthetic pyrethroid and the pyrrole insecticide, chlorfenapyr. Insect growth regulators, such as hydroprene (Gentrol), are also sometimes used.

Populations in Arkansas have been found to be highly resistant to DDT, with an LD_{50} of more than 100,000 ppm. DDT was seen to make bed bugs more active in studies conducted in Africa.

Bed bug pesticide-resistance appears to be increasing dramatically. Bed bug populations sampled across the U.S. showed a tolerance for pyrethroids several thousand times greater than laboratory bed bugs. New York City bed bugs have been found to be 264 times more resistant to deltamethrin than Florida bed bugs due to mutations and evolution. Products developed in the mid 2010s combine neonicotinoids with pyrethroids, but according to a January 2016 survey published by the Journal of Medical Entomology, bed bug resistance in two major US cities now includes neonicotinoids.

A population genetics study of bed bugs in the United States, Canada, and Australia using a mitochondrial DNA marker found high levels of genetic variation. This suggests the studied bed bug populations did not undergo a genetic bottleneck as one would expect from insecticide control during the 1940s and 1950s, but instead, that populations may have been maintained on other hosts such as birds and bats. In contrast to the high amount of genetic variation observed with the mitochondrial DNA marker, no genetic variation in a nuclear RNA marker was observed. This suggests increased gene flow of previously isolated bed bug populations, and given the absence of barriers to gene flow, the spread of insecticide resistance may be rapid.

== Biopesticides ==
Preliminary research has shown the fungal biopesticide Beauveria bassiana, which has been used for years as an outdoor organic pesticide, is also highly effective at eliminating bed bugs exposed to cotton fabric sprayed with fungus spores. It is also effective against bed bug colonies due to the spores carried by infected bugs back to their harborages. Unlike typical insecticides, exposure to the fungus does not kill instantly, but kills bugs within five days of exposure. Some people, especially those with compromised immune systems, may react negatively to the concentrated presence of the fungus directly following an application.

== Physical isolation ==
Isolation of humans is attempted with numerous devices and methods including zippered bed bug-proof mattress covers, bed-leg moat devices, double sided tape, and other barriers. However, even with isolated beds, bed bug infestations persist if the bed itself is not free of bed bugs, or if it is re-infested, which could happen quite easily.

It is convenient to place medium-sized belongings in sealed transparent plastic bags (such as plastic bags for freezing; larger models exist as well). Once closed, the tightness should be verified by pressing the bag and ensuring that air doesn't exit. It is as well convenient to mark these sealed bags as 'contaminated'/'decontaminated'.

== Inorganic materials ==
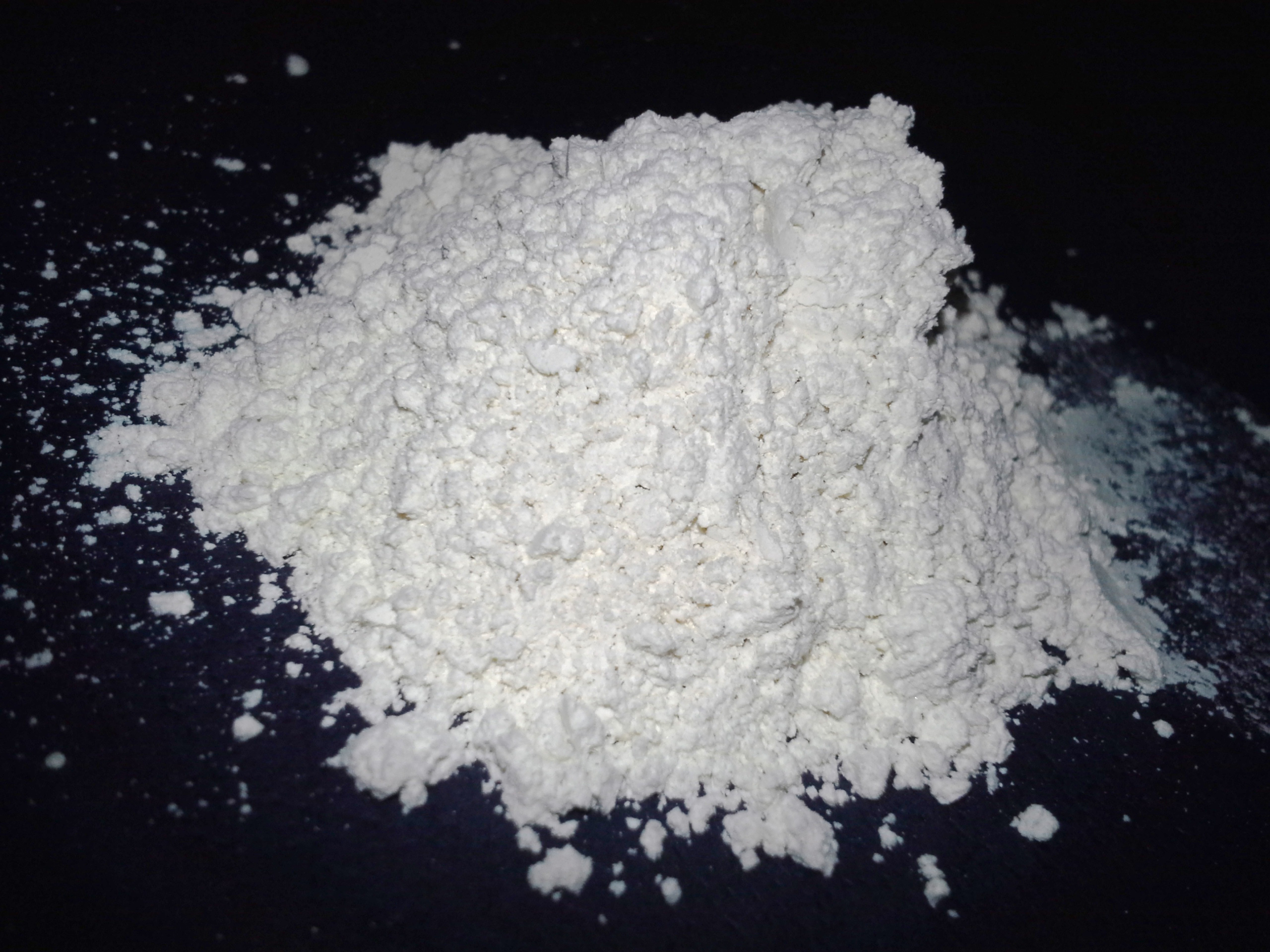
A sample of food-grade diatomaceous earth

Inorganic materials such as diatomaceous earth or amorphous silica gel may be used in conjunction with other methods to manage a bed bug infestation, provided they are used in a dry environment. Upon contact with such dust-like materials, the waxy outer layer of the insect's exoskeleton is disrupted, which causes them to dehydrate.

Food-grade diatomaceous earth has been widely used to combat infestations. However, it can take weeks to have a significant effect. Studies examined and compared diatomaceous earth and synthetically produced, pure amorphous (i.e. non-crystalline) silica, so-called silica gel. They investigated the use of these substances as a stand-alone treatment in real-life scenarios, and compared them to usual poisonous agents. They found that the effect of diatomaceous earth was surprisingly low when used in real-life scenarios, while the synthetic product was extremely effective and fast in killing bed bugs in such settings.

Silica gel was also more effective than usual poisonous pesticides (particularly in cases with pesticide resistant bugs). When applied after being mixed with water and then sprayed, the outcome for silica gel was significantly lower, but still distinctly better than for the natural silica (used dry). Authors argued that the reason for the poor outcome for diatomaceous earth as a stand-alone treatment was multi-factorial. When tested in laboratory where the bed bugs had intensive, prolonged contact with diatomaceous earth and no access to a host, diatomaceous earth performed very well. Silica gel, on the other side, performed in vitro consistently well even if applied to bed bugs in extremely low doses and with very slight and short (often only seconds or few minutes) contact to the substance.

Although occasionally applied as a safe indoor pesticide treatment for other insects, boric acid is ineffectual against bed bugs because bed bugs do not groom.

== Organic materials ==
=== Bean leaves ===
A traditional Balkan method of trapping bed bugs is to spread bean leaves in infested areas. The trichomes (microscopic hooked hairs) on the leaves trap the bugs by piercing the tarsi joints of the bed bug's arthropod legs. As a bug struggles to get free, it impales itself further on the bean leaf's trichomes. The bed bugs and leaves then can be collected and destroyed. Researchers are examining ways to reproduce this capability with artificial materials.

=== Essential oils ===
Many claims have been made about essential oils killing bed bugs. However, they are unproven. The FTC is now filing a suit against companies making these claims about these oils, specifically about cedar, cinnamon, lemongrass, peppermint, and clove oils.

== Contaminated belongings ==
Disposal of items from the contaminated area can reduce the population of bed bugs and unhatched eggs. Removal of items such as mattresses, box springs, couches etc. is costly and usually insufficient to eradicate infestation because of eggs and adults hiding in surrounding areas. If the entire infestation is not eliminated prior to bringing new or cleaned personal and household items back into a home, these items will likely become infested and require additional treatment.

Treating clothing, shoes, linens, and other household items within the affected environment is difficult and frequently ineffective because of the difficulty of keeping cleaned items quarantined from infestation. Many bed bug exterminating specialists recommend removing personal and household items from the infested structure. Many metropolitan areas offer more effective treatments such as high-heat dryers and dry cleaning with PERC with the added benefit of the treated items remaining stored until the affected home's bed bug infestation is eradicated.

The improper disposal of infested furniture also facilitates the spread of bed bugs. Marking the discarded items as infested can help prevent infesting new areas. Bed bugs can go without feeding for 20 to 400 days, depending on temperature and humidity. Older stages of nymphs can survive longer without feeding than younger ones, and adults have survived without food for more than 400 days in the laboratory at low temperatures. Adults may live up to one year or more, and there can be up to four successive generations per year.

== Vacuuming ==
Vacuuming helps with reducing bed bug infestations, but does not eliminate bed bugs hidden inside of materials. Also, unless the contents of the vacuum are emptied immediately after each use, bed bugs may crawl out through the vacuum's hoses and re-establish themselves. Vacuuming with a large bristle attachment can also aid in removing hidden bugs as well.

== Heat treatment ==
=== Steam ===
Steam treatment can effectively kill all stages of bed bugs. To be effective, steam treatment must reach 150–170 degrees Fahrenheit (65 - 75 °C) for a sustained period. Unfortunately, bed bugs hide in a diversity of places, making steam treatment very tedious, labour-intensive and time consuming. There is also the risk of the steam not penetrating materials enough to kill hidden bed bugs. The steam may also damage materials such as varnished wood, or cause mold from the moisture left behind. Effective treatment requires repeated and very thorough steaming of the mattress, box spring, bed frame, bed covers, pillows, not to mention other materials and objects within the infested room, such as carpets and curtains.

Infested clothes can be effectively treated by a high-temperature ironing with vapor. If performed meticulously, this method yields faster disinfection compared to high-temperature washing in a washing machine. However, attention should be paid in order to avoid bed bug escape from the ironed clothes.

For volumetric objects (e.g. pillow, blanket, sleeping bag, rug), boiling in a large saucepan for more than 10 minutes represents a reliable method. In this manner, the lethal temperatures propagate with certainty deep inside the object, which is not necessarily the case of a washing machine cleaning cycle.

For smaller objects, pouring boiling water from a kettle onto the object located in a basin may be enough to kill bed bugs and eggs.

=== Clothes dryers ===
Clothes dryers can be used for killing bed bugs in clothing and blankets. Infested clothes and bedding are first washed in hot water with laundry detergent then placed in the dryer, and then after the items are completely dry, continue drying for at least 20 minutes longer at high heat. However, this does not eliminate bed bugs in the mattress, bed frame and surrounding environment. Sterilized fabrics from the dryer are thus easily re-infested. Continually treating materials in this fashion is labour-intensive, and in itself does not eliminate the infestation.

=== Hot boxes ===
Placing belongings in a hot box, a device that provides sustained heat at temperatures that kills bed bugs, larvae, and eggs, but that does not damage clothing, is an option. Pest control companies often rent the devices at nominal cost and it may make sense for frequent travelers to invest in one.

=== Building heat treatment ===
This method of bed bug control involves raising room temperatures to or above the killing temperature for bed bugs, which is around 45 °C (113 °F). Heat treatments are generally carried out by professionals, and may be performed in a single area or an entire building. Heat treatment offers certain advantages when it comes to bed bug management. Heat is non-toxic, and can kill all bed bug life stages including bed bug eggs.

HEPA air filtration is normally used during any heat treatment to capture particulate and biological matter that may be aerosolized during the heating process. HEPA filters capture 99.97% of particles ≥0.3 microns, helping remove allergens and fine dust during heat treatment.

== Freezing ==
Adult bed bugs can be killed by a direct one-hour exposure to temperatures of −16 °C (3 °F), however, adult bed bugs have the capacity for rapid cold hardening, i.e. an hour-long exposure to 0 °C (32 °F) improved their subsequent tolerance of −14 to −16 °C (7 to 3 °F), so this may need to be maintained for longer. Eggs and other life cycle of bed bugs can be killed by a direct two-hour exposure to temperatures of −17 °C (1 °F). It is estimated that a bag of laundry placed in a domestic freezer takes roughly 8 hours to reach a temperature of −17 °C (1 °F). Placing contaminated objects in a domestic freezer for 35 hours is considered effective at killing eggs as well as all stages of bugs. Higher temperatures however are not effective, and survival is estimated for temperatures above −12 °C (10 °F) even after 1 week of continuous exposure.

This method requires a freezer capable of maintaining, and set to, a temperature below −16 °C (3 °F). Most home freezers are capable of maintaining this temperature.

== Predators ==
Natural enemies of bed bugs include the masked hunter (or masked bed bug hunter) insect, cockroaches, ants, spiders (particularly Thanatus flavidus), mites, and centipedes (particularly the house centipede Scutigera coleoptrata). However, biological pest control is not considered practical for eliminating bed bugs from human dwellings.

While there have been few studies, the known predators of bed bugs are listed in the section on "parasites and predators" of a 1990 academic paper on bed bugs and public health.

== See also ==
- Bed bug detection dogs
