= Cimex antennatus =

Scientific classification
- Kingdom: Animalia
- Phylum: Arthropoda
- Class: Insecta
- Order: Hemiptera
- Suborder: Heteroptera
- Family: Cimicidae
- Genus: Cimex
- Species: C. antennatus

Binomial name
- Cimex antennatus Usinger & Ueshima, 1965

Species of true bug

Cimex antennatus is a species of Cimicidae (bed bugs) endemic to North America. Its primary hosts are bats.
