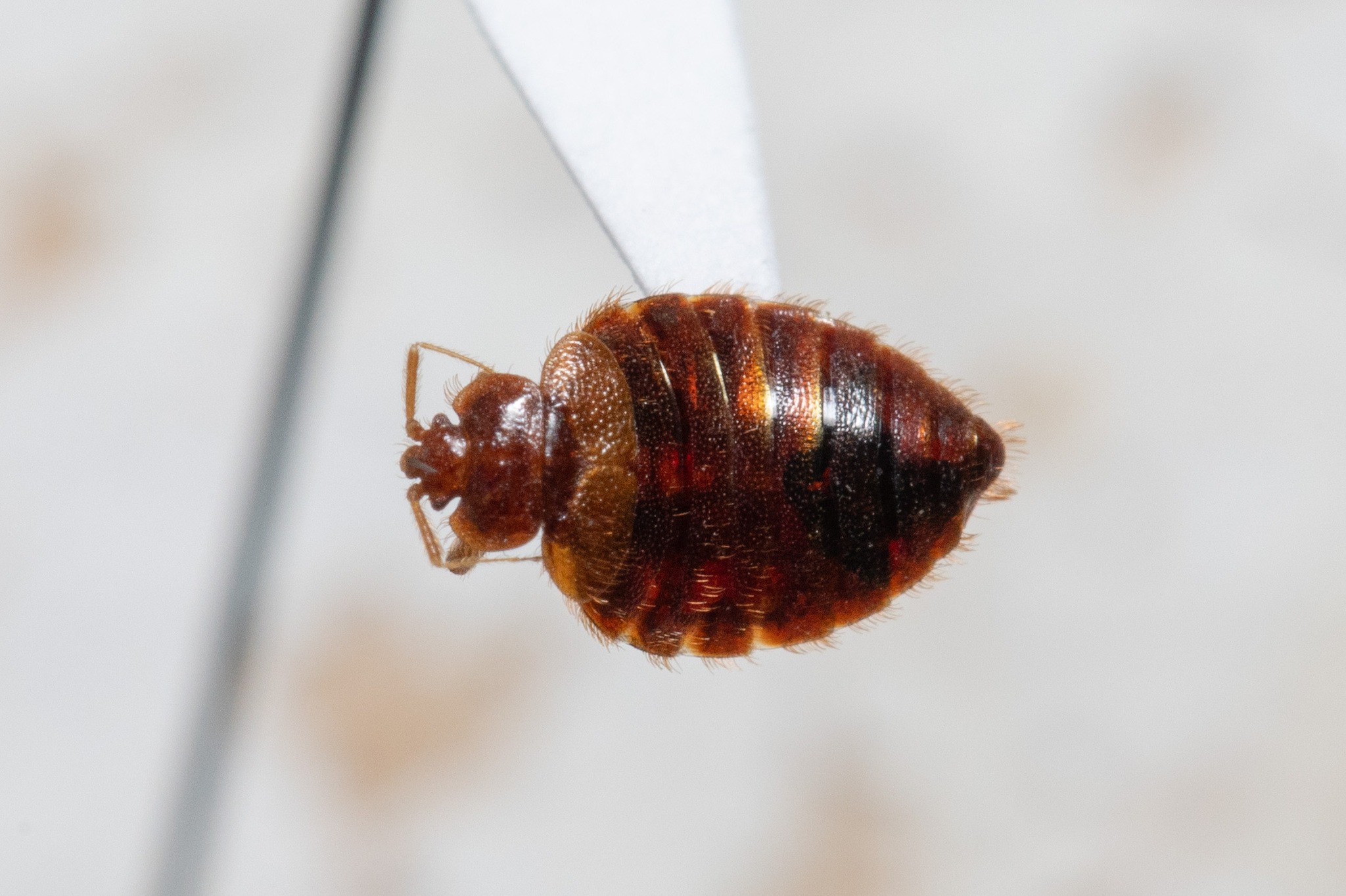

Scientific classification
- Kingdom: Animalia
- Phylum: Arthropoda
- Clade: Pancrustacea
- Class: Insecta
- Order: Hemiptera
- Suborder: Heteroptera
- Family: Cimicidae
- Genus: Cimex
- Species: C. adjunctus

Binomial name
- Cimex adjunctus Barber, 1939

= Cimex adjunctus =

Species of true bug

Cimex adjunctus, is an ectoparasite found in a wide range across North America. Like other insects in the genus Cimex, C. adjunctus is a temporary parasite that feeds on blood, not lingering on its hosts between meals. C. adjunctus feed on the blood of many insectivorous bat species. On a number of occasions, these insects have been found on the wings of Eptesicus fuscus (big brown bat).
