= Cimex pilosellus =

Scientific classification
- Domain: Eukaryota
- Kingdom: Animalia
- Phylum: Arthropoda
- Class: Insecta
- Order: Hemiptera
- Suborder: Heteroptera
- Family: Cimicidae
- Genus: Cimex
- Species: C. pilosellus

Binomial name
- Cimex pilosellus (Horváth, 1910)

Species of true bug

Cimex pilosellus, known generally as the bat bug or western bat bug, is a species of bed bug in the family Cimicidae. It is found in North America.
