= National Pest Management Association =

American trade association

- Logo of the National Pest Management Association.
- Abbreviation: NPMA
- Formation: 1933
- Type: 501(c)(6) non-profit organization
- Headquarters: Fairfax, Virginia
- Region served: United States
- Members: 4,000+ companies
- Board of Directors President: Mike Bullert
- Board of Directors President-Elect: Bob Dold
- Chief Executive Officer: Dominique Stumpf, CAE
- Website: www.npmapestworld.org

The National Pest Management Association (NPMA), is a non-profit trade association founded in 1933 that aims to represent the interests of the professional pest management and pest control industries in the United States.

The NPMA is headquartered in Fairfax, Virginia.

== Organization ==
The policy-making body of NPMA is governed by the board of directors. As of 2026, it has a membership of over 4,000 company members worldwide.

== Activities ==
Members have access to accredited continuing education, technical resources, pest management research and reporting, and business service discounts. Its technical department provides pest identification and treatment recommendations. The NPMA government affairs staff provides consultation on legislative and regulatory issues that impact pest management companies.

== Community relations ==
As the NPMA’s consumer education arm, the Professional Pest Management Alliance (PPMA) educates home and business owners about health and property risks associated with pests. It has developed educational resources such as PestWorld, an information repository on pest identification and management, and PestWorld for Kids as a scholastic resource.

NPMA also funds scientific research in entomology within the area of community pest control through its affiliated Pest Management Foundation. It provides research on pest populations and treatment options including bed bugs, cockroaches, and brown marmorated stink bugs.

== Public policy ==
NPMA represents the industry in Congress and before federal agencies, and also in state legislatures and agencies. Its policy work is focused on pesticide regulation, environmental protection, workforce safety, and integrated pest management.

NPMA developed QualityPro, the pest management industry's leading accreditation program, was established in 2004 and administered by the Foundation for Professional Pest Management with NPMA's endorsement. To earn the accreditation, a pest control company must meet 18 standards covering areas such as employee background checks, a drug-free workplace policy, and other business/service practices. NPMA states that fewer than 3% of pest control companies in the United States hold the QualityPro designation with more than 500 companies accredited.

Under the QualityPro umbrella, GreenPro, green pest management certification program, was made available to pest control companies, in 2009. As of June 2013, more than 140 companies nationwide have been designated as GreenPro. This program has been nationally recognized by organizations that promote integrated approaches to reducing and eliminating pest populations, including: Natural Resources Defense Council (NDRC), EPA Pesticide Environmental Stewardship Program (PESP) and the Green Restaurant Association (GRA).

NPMA also maintains Pest PAC, a political action committee to advocate for the pest management industry at the forefront of congressional thinking.
