= Agence nationale de sécurité sanitaire de l'alimentation, de l'environnement et du travail =

French government agency

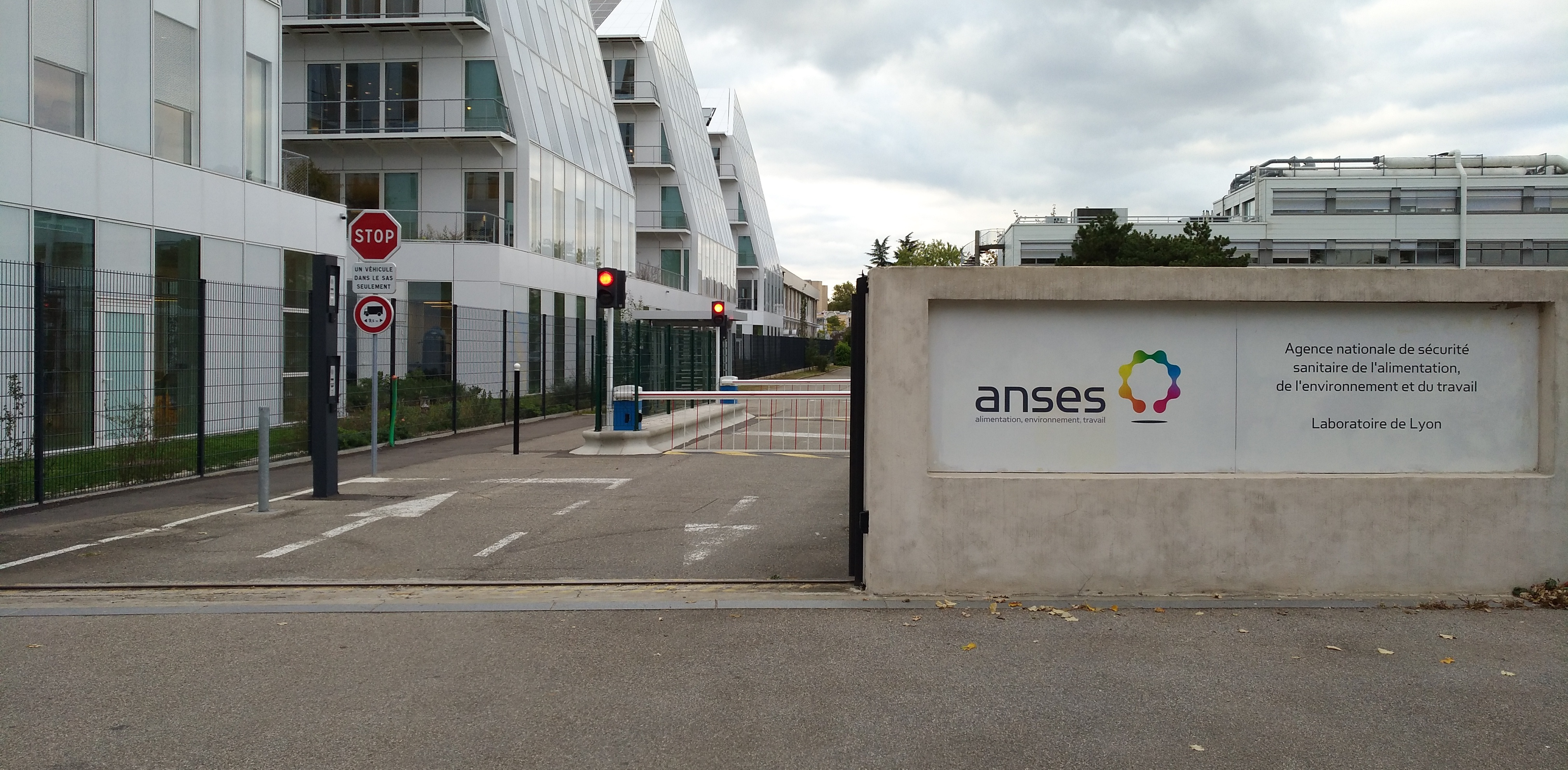
A laboratory of ANSES in Lyon.

The French Agency for Food, Environmental and Occupational Health & Safety (ANSES) is a French government agency whose main mission is to assess health risks in food, the environment and work, with the aim of enlightening public policy-making. ANSES employs about 1,400 people and it is accountable to the French Ministries of Health, Agriculture, the Environment, Labour and Consumer Affairs.
