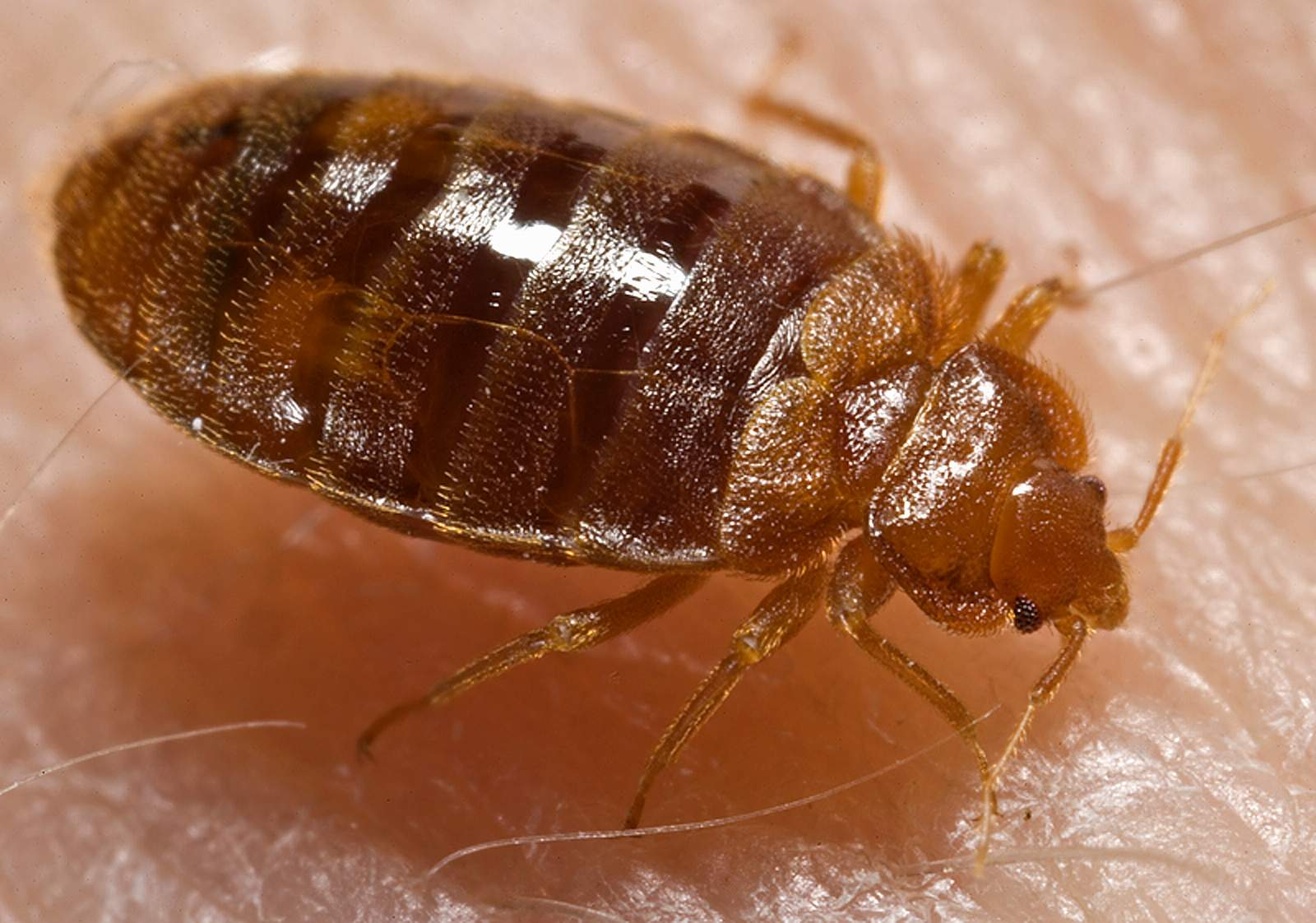
- Cimex lectularius

Scientific classification
- Kingdom: Animalia
- Phylum: Arthropoda
- Clade: Pancrustacea
- Class: Insecta
- Order: Hemiptera
- Suborder: Heteroptera
- Family: Cimicidae
- Genus: Cimex; Linnaeus, 1758

Species
- Cimex adjunctus; Cimex antennatus; Cimex brevis; Cimex columbarius; Cimex emarginatus; Cimex hemipterus (C. rotundatus); Cimex incrassatus; Cimex japonicus; Cimex latipennis; Cimex lectularius; Cimex pilosellus; Cimex pipistrelli

= Cimex =

Genus of true bugs

Cimex is a genus of insects in the family Cimicidae. Cimex species are ectoparasites that typically feed on the blood of birds and mammals. Cimex lectularius and Cimex hemipterus are known as bed bugs and frequently feed on humans, although other species may parasitize humans opportunistically. Species primarily parasitizing bats are known as bat bugs.

The insects are 3 to 9 millimetres (0.12 to 0.35 in) long and have flattened reddish-brown bodies with small nonfunctional wings.

== Description ==
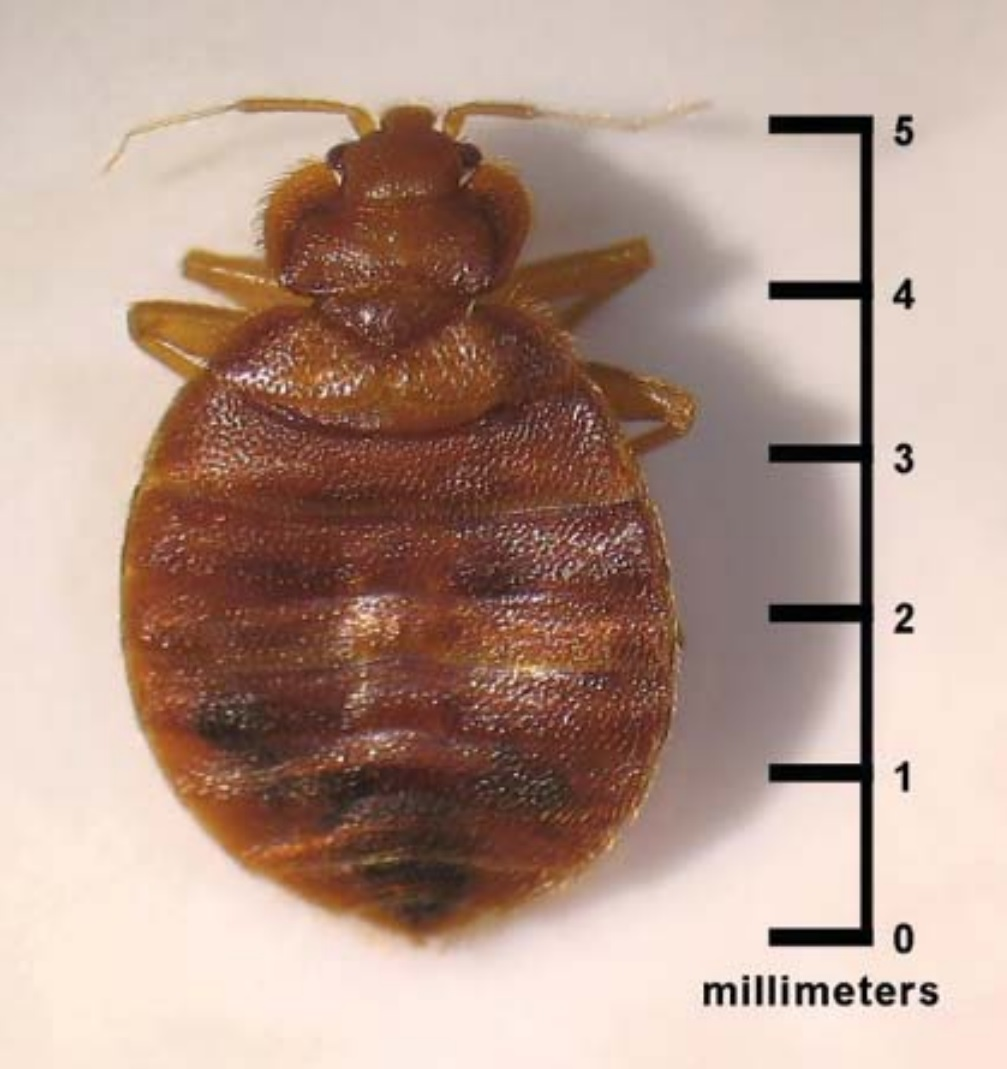
An adult bed bug (Cimex lectularius)

Adult Cimex are light brown to reddish-brown, flat and oval. The mouthparts are beak-like, and adapted for piercing and sucking. Following a blood meal the abdomen is plump and darker in colour. The front wings are vestigial and reduced to pad-like structures. Cimex lacks hind wings. They have segmented abdomens with microscopic hairs that give them a banded appearance. Adults grow to 3 to 9 mm (0.12 to 0.35 in) long. The different species are very similar in morphology and can be separated only by microscopic examination. Sexual dimorphism occurs in C. lectularius, with the females averaging larger in size than the males. The abdomens of the sexes differ in that the males appear to have "pointed" abdomens, which are actually their copulatory organs, while females have more rounded abdomens.

Newly hatched nymphs are translucent, light in color at first, becoming browner as they moult and approach maturity. A Cimex nymph of any age that has just consumed a blood meal has a bright red, translucent abdomen, fading to brown over the next several hours, and to opaque black within two days as the insect digests its meal. Cimex may be mistaken for other insects, such as booklice, small cockroaches, or carpet beetles; however, when warm and active, their movements are more ant-like, and like most other true bugs, they emit a characteristic disagreeable odor when crushed.

Cimex use pheromones and kairomones to communicate regarding nesting locations, feeding, and reproduction.

The lifespan of Cimex varies by species and is also dependent on feeding.

== Taxonomy ==
- Cimex adjunctus, bat bug found in Eastern United States
- Cimex antennatus, bat bug from Pacific North America
- Cimex brevis
- Cimex columbarius, infesting pigeon nests
- Cimex emarginatus, bat bug from the Balkan Peninsula
- Cimex hemipterus, tropical bed bug
- Cimex incrassatus
- Cimex japonicus, bat bug found in Japan
- Cimex latipennis, bat bug from Pacific North America
- Cimex lectularius, common bed bug with cosmopolitan distribution
- Cimex pilosellus, bat bug found in northern United States and Canada
- Cimex pipistrelli, European bat bug

== Biology ==
Research on C. lectularius shows that it can survive a wide range of temperatures and atmospheric compositions. Below 16 °C (61 °F), adults enter semi-hibernation and can survive longer; they can survive for at least five days at −10 °C (14 °F), but die after 15 minutes of exposure to −32 °C (−26 °F). Common commercial and residential freezers reach temperatures low enough to kill most life stages of bed bug, with 95% mortality after 3 days at −12 °C (10 °F). They show high desiccation tolerance, surviving low humidity and a 35–40 °C (95–104 °F) range even after the loss of one-third of their body weight; earlier life stages are more susceptible to drying out than later ones.

The thermal death point for C. lectularius is 45 °C (113 °F); all stages of life are killed by 7 minutes of exposure to 46 °C (115 °F). Bed bugs apparently cannot survive high concentrations of carbon dioxide for very long; exposure to nearly pure nitrogen atmospheres, however, appears to have relatively little effect even after 72 hours.

Household insecticides often do not have a prolonged effect on the bug population. Professional pest control experts may use potentially harmful substances such as chlorpyrifos.

== Feeding habits ==
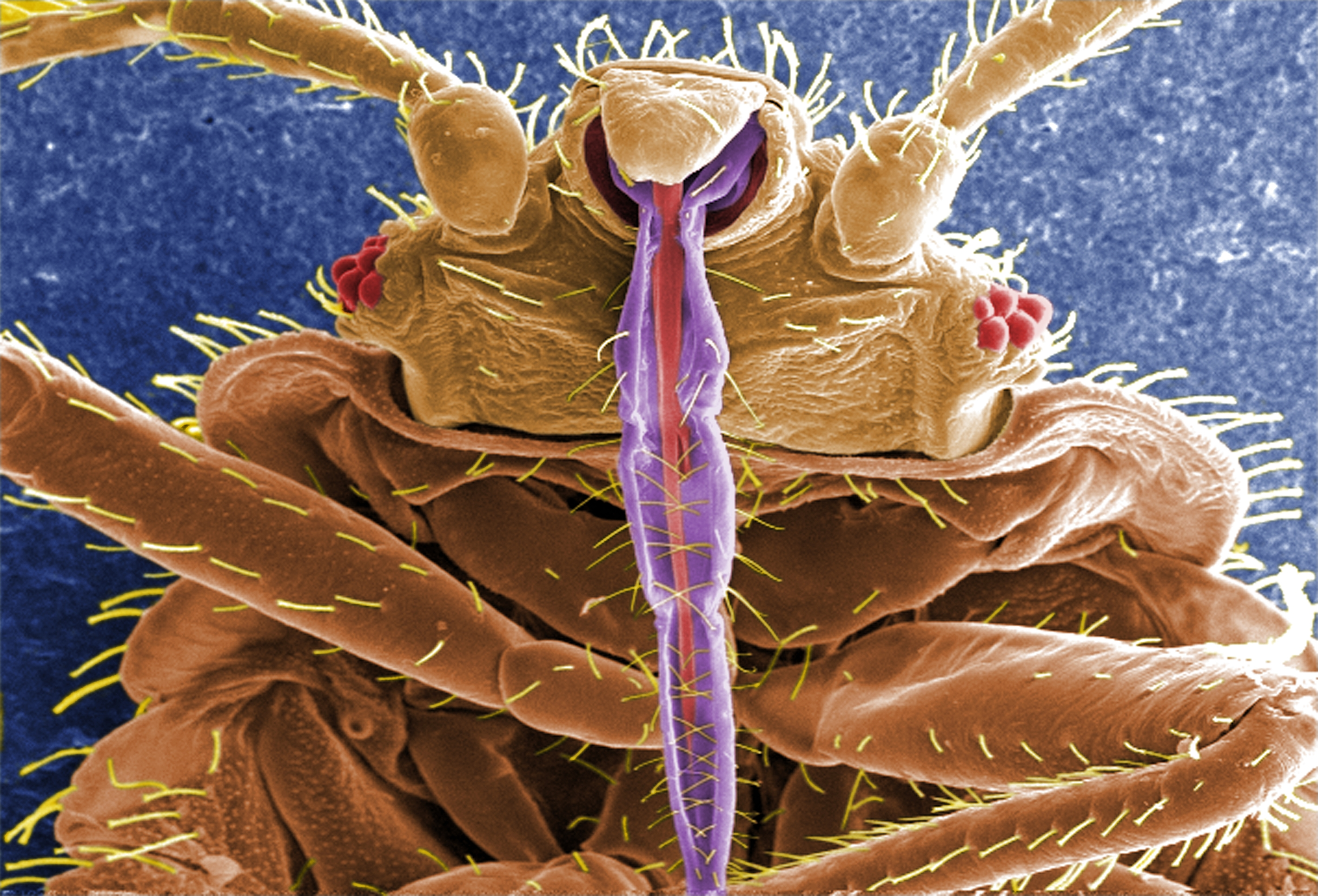
Scanning electron micrograph (SEM) digitally colorized with skin-piercing mouthparts highlighted in purple and red

Cimex are obligatory hematophagous (bloodsucking) insects. Most species feed on humans only when other prey are unavailable. They obtain all the additional moisture they need from water vapor in the surrounding air. Cimex are attracted to their hosts primarily by carbon dioxide, secondarily by warmth, and also by certain chemicals. Bed bugs prefer exposed skin, preferably the face, neck, and arms of a sleeping person.

Bed bugs have mouth parts that saw through the skin, and inject saliva with anticoagulants and painkillers. Sensitivity of humans varies from extreme allergic reaction to no reaction at all (about 20%). The bite usually produces a swelling with no red spot, but when many bugs feed on a small area, reddish spots may appear after the swelling subsides. The bite marks may appear in a straight line.

Although under certain cool conditions adult Cimex can live for over a year without feeding, under typically warm conditions they try to feed at five- to ten-day intervals, and adults can survive for about five months without food. Younger instars cannot survive nearly as long, though even the vulnerable newly hatched first instars can survive for weeks without taking a blood meal.

At the 57th annual meeting of the Entomological Society of America in 2009, newer generations of pesticide-resistant C. lectularius in Virginia were reported to survive only two months without feeding.

DNA from human blood meals can be recovered from Cimex for up to 90 days, which means they can be used for forensic purposes in identifying on whom the bed bugs have fed.

=== Feeding physiology ===
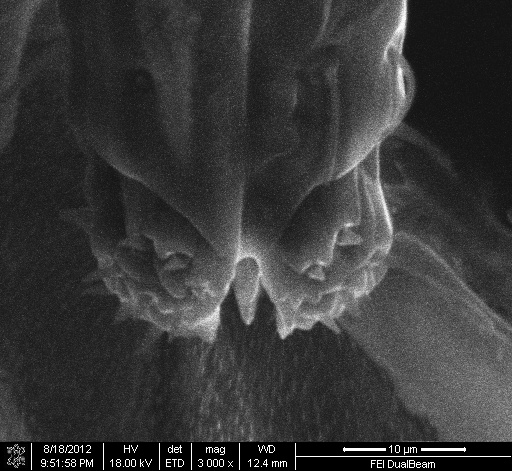
Rostrum tip

Cimex pierces the skin of its host with a stylet fascicle, rostrum, or "beak". The rostrum is composed of the maxillae and mandibles, which have been modified into elongated shapes from a basic, ancestral style. The right and left maxillary stylets are connected at their midline and a section at the centerline forms a large food canal and a smaller salivary canal. The entire maxillary and mandibular bundle penetrates the skin.

The tips of the right and left maxillary stylets are not the same; the right is hook-like and curved, and the left is straight. The right and left mandibular stylets extend along the outer sides of their respective maxillary stylets and do not reach anywhere near the tip of the fused maxillary stylets. The stylets are retained in a groove in the labium, and during feeding, they are freed from the groove as the jointed labium is bent or folded out of the way; its tip never enters the wound.

The mandibular stylet tips have small teeth, and through alternately moving these stylets back and forth, the insect cuts a path through tissue for the maxillary bundle to reach an appropriately sized blood vessel. Pressure from the blood vessel itself fills the insect with blood in three to five minutes. The bug then withdraws the stylet bundle from the feeding position and retracts it back into the labial groove, folds the entire unit back under the head, and returns to its hiding place. It takes between five and ten minutes for a Cimex to become completely engorged with blood. In all, the insect may spend less than 20 minutes in physical contact with its host, and does not try to feed again until it has either completed a moult or, if an adult, has thoroughly digested the meal.

== Reproduction ==
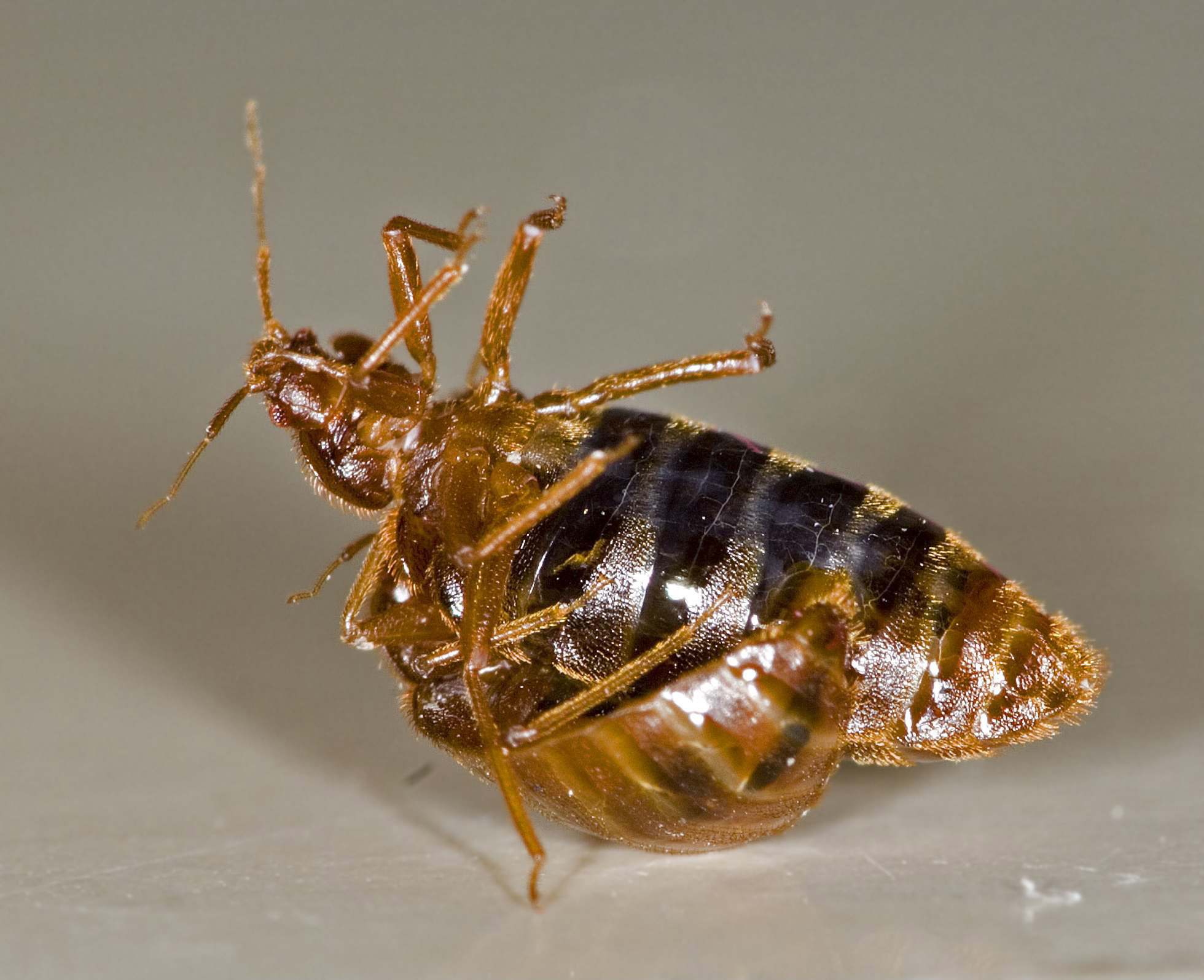
Male bed bug traumatically inseminating a female

Since males are attracted to large body size, any Cimex with a recent blood meal can be seen as a potential mate. However, males will mount unfed, flat females on occasion. The female is able to curl her abdomen forward and underneath toward the head to deter the male if she does not wish to mate. Males are generally unable to discriminate between the sexes until after mounting, but can do so before insemination. North Carolina State University found that bed bugs in contrast to most other insects tolerate incest and are able to genetically withstand the effects of inbreeding quite well. Male bed bugs sometimes attempt to mate with other males and pierce their abdomens. This behaviour occurs because sexual attraction in bed bugs is based primarily on size, and males mount any freshly fed partner regardless of sex.

All Cimex mate by traumatic insemination. Female Cimex possess a reproductive tract that functions during oviposition, but the male does not use this tract for sperm insemination. Instead, the male pierces the female's abdomen with his hypodermic penis and ejaculates into the body cavity. In all bed bug species except Primicimex cavernis, sperm are injected into the mesospermalege, a component of the spermalege, a secondary genital structure that reduces the wounding and immunological costs of traumatic insemination. Injected sperm travel via the haemolymph (blood) to sperm storage structures called seminal conceptacles, with fertilisation eventually taking place at the ovaries.

The "Cimex alarm pheromone" consists of (E)-2-octenal and (E)-2-hexenal. It is released when the insect is disturbed, as during an attack by a predator. A 2009 study demonstrated the alarm pheromone is also released by male Cimex to repel other males that attempt to mate with them.

C. lectularius and C. hemipterus mate with each other given the opportunity, but the eggs then produced are usually sterile. In a 1988 study, one of 479 eggs was fertile and resulted in a hybrid, Cimex hemipterus × lectularius.

=== Sperm protection ===
Cimex lectularius males have environmental microbes on their genitals. These microbes damage sperm cells, leaving them unable to fertilize female gametes. Due to these dangerous microbes, males have evolved antimicrobial ejaculate substances that prevent sperm damage. When the microbes contact sperm or the male genitals, the bed bug releases antimicrobial substances. Many species of these microbes live in the bodies of females after mating. The microbes can cause infections in the females. It has been suggested that females receive benefit from the ejaculate. Although the benefit is not direct, females are able to produce more eggs than optimum increasing the amount of the females' genes in the gene pool.

=== Sperm and seminal fluid allocation ===
In organisms, sexual selection extends past differential reproduction to affect sperm composition, sperm competition, and ejaculate size. Males of C. lectularius allocate 12% of their sperm and 19% of their seminal fluid per mating. Due to these findings, Reinhard et al. proposed that multiple mating is limited by seminal fluid and not sperm. After measuring ejaculate volume, mating rate and estimating sperm density, Reinhardt et al. showed that mating could be limited by seminal fluid. Despite these advances, the cost difference between ejaculate-dose dependence and mating frequency dependence have not been explored.

=== Egg production ===
Males fertilize females only by traumatic insemination into the structure called the ectospermalege (the organ of Berlese, however the organ of Ribaga, as it was first named, was first designated as an organ of stridulation. These two names are not descriptive, so other terminologies are used). On fertilization, the female's ovaries finish developing, which suggests that sperm plays a role other than fertilizing the egg. Fertilization also allows for egg production through the corpus allatum. Sperm remains viable in a female's spermathecae (a better term is conceptacle), a sperm-carrying sack, for a long period of time as long as body temperature is optimum. The female lays fertilized eggs until she depletes the sperm found in her conceptacle. After the depletion of sperm, she lays a few sterile eggs. The number of eggs a C. lectularius female produces does not depend on the sperm she harbors, but on the female's nutritional level.

=== Alarm pheromones ===
In C. lectularius, males sometimes mount other males because male sexual interest is directed at any recently fed individual regardless of their sex, but unfed females may also be mounted. Traumatic insemination is the only way for copulation to occur in Cimex. Females have evolved the spermalege to protect themselves from wounding and infection. Because males lack this organ, traumatic insemination could leave them badly injured. For this reason, males have evolved alarm pheromones to signal their sex to other males. If a male C. lectularius mounts another male, the mounted male releases the pheromone signal and the male on top stops before insemination.

Females are capable of producing alarm pheromones to avoid multiple mating, but they generally do not do so. Two reasons are proposed as to why females do not release alarm pheromones to protect themselves. First, alarm pheromone production is costly. Due to egg production, females may refrain from spending additional energy on alarm pheromones. The second proposed reason is that releasing the alarm pheromone reduces the benefits associated with multiple mating. Benefits of multiple mating include material benefits, better quality nourishment or more nourishment, genetic benefits including increased fitness of offspring, and finally, the cost of resistance may be higher than the benefit of consent—which appears the case in C. lectularius.

== Life stages ==
Bed bugs have five immature nymph life stages and a final sexually mature adult stage. They shed their skins through ecdysis at each stage, discarding their outer exoskeleton, which is a somewhat clear, empty exoskeleton of the bugs themselves. Cimex must molt six times before becoming fertile adults, and must consume at least one blood meal to complete each molt.

Each of the immature stages lasts about a week, depending on temperature and the availability of food, and the complete lifecycle can be completed in as little as two months (rather long compared to other ectoparasites). Fertilized females with enough food lay three to four eggs each day continually until the end of their lifespans (about nine months under warm conditions), possibly generating as many as 500 eggs in this time. Genetic analysis has shown that a single pregnant Cimex, possibly a single survivor of eradication, can be responsible for an entire infestation over a matter of weeks, rapidly producing generations of offspring.

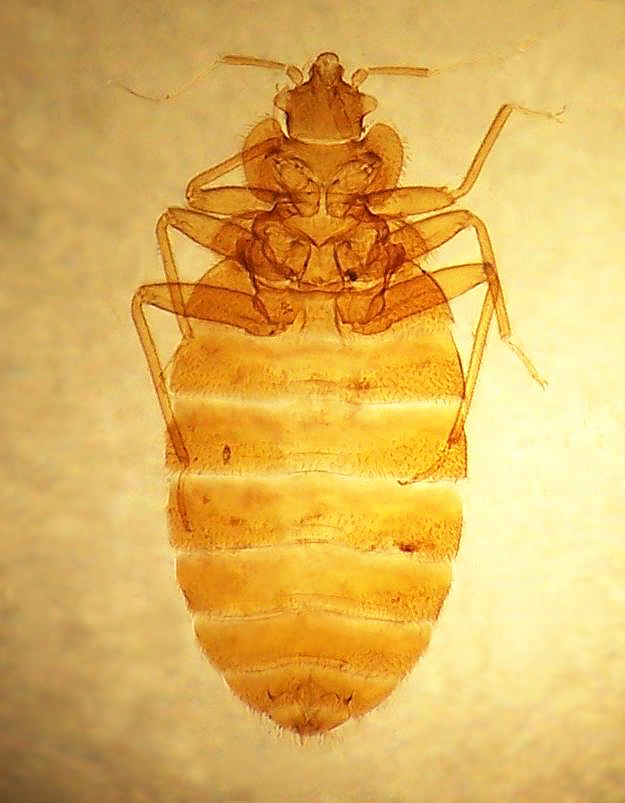
Slide of C. lectularius

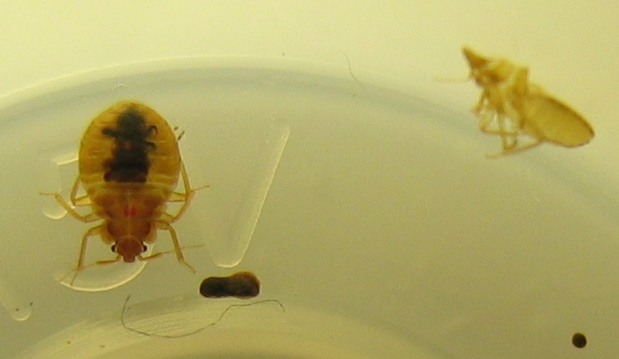
On the right is recently sloughed skin from its nymph stage

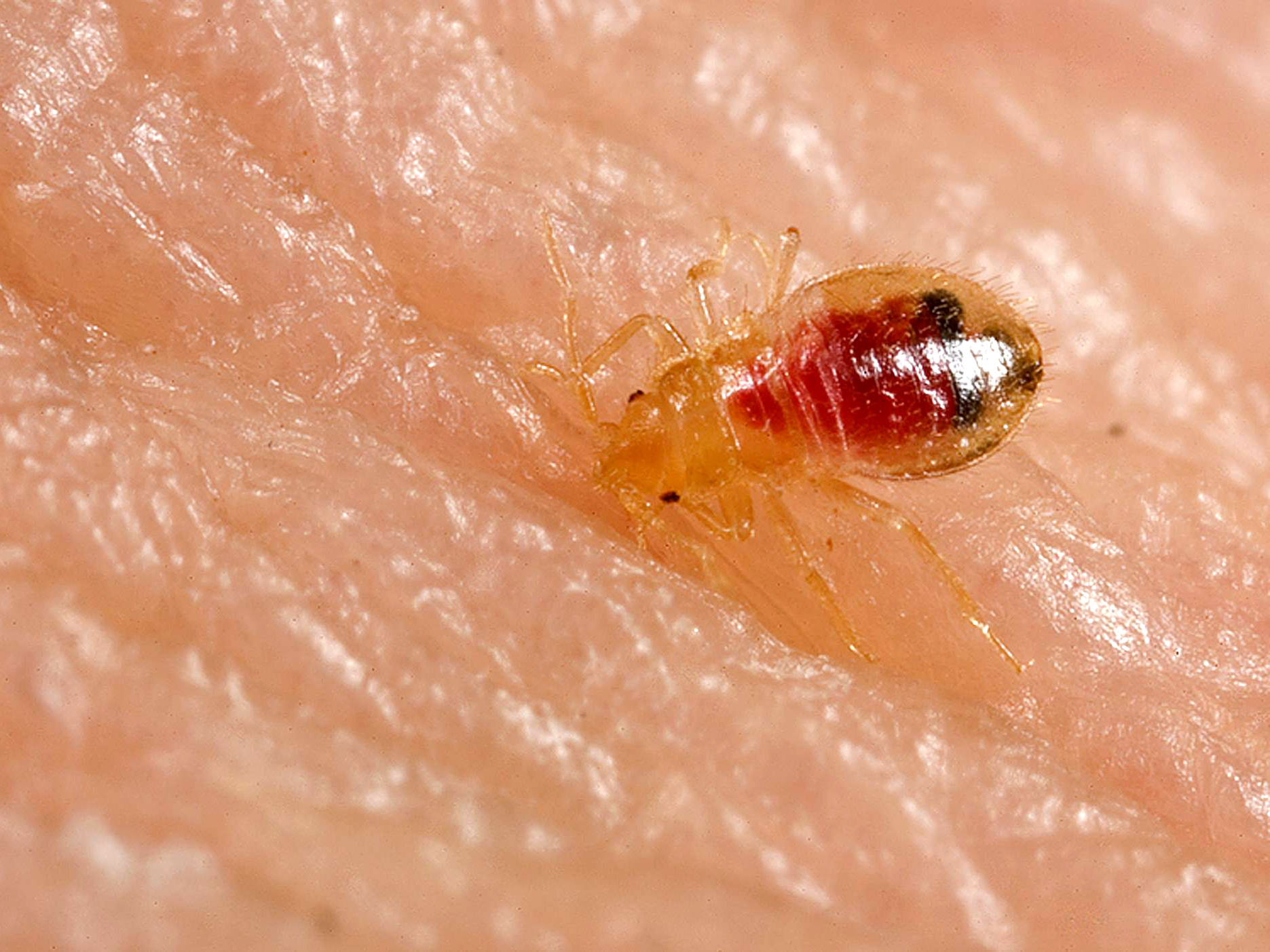
Nymph feeding on host

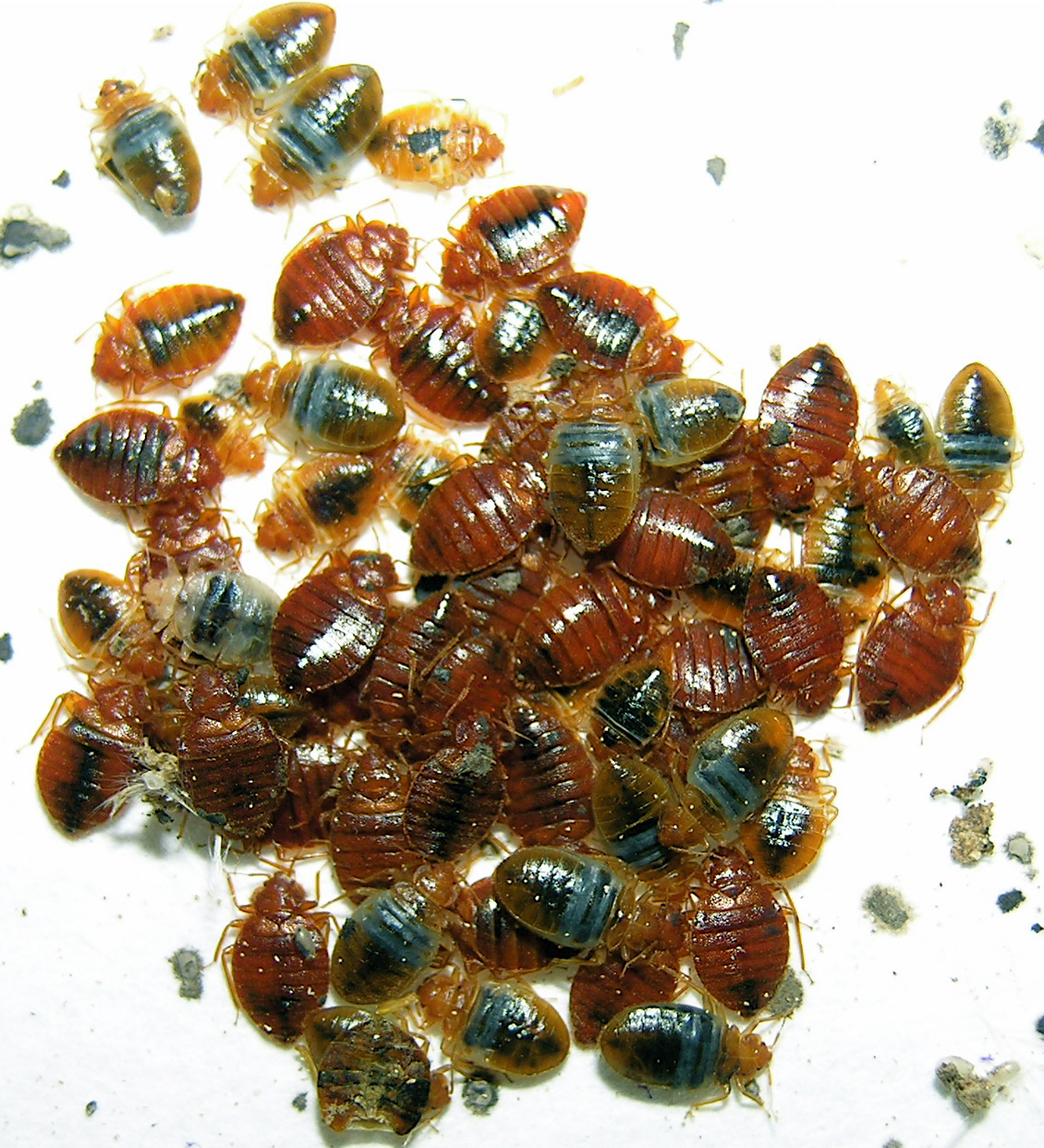
Blood-fed stage (note differences in color with respect to digestion of blood meal)

== Host searching ==
Cimex lectularius feeds only every five to seven days, which suggests that it does not spend the majority of its life searching for a host. When a Cimex is starved, it leaves its shelter and searches for a host. If it successfully feeds, it returns to its shelter; otherwise, it continues to search for a host. After searching—regardless of whether or not it has eaten—the Cimex returns to the shelter to aggregate before the photophase (period of light during a day-night cycle). Reis argues that two reasons explain why C. lectularius would return to its shelter and aggregate after feeding. One is to find a mate and the other is to find shelter to avoid getting smashed after eating.

== Aggregation and dispersal behavior ==
Cimex lectularius aggregates under all life stages and mating conditions. Cimex may choose to aggregate because of predation, resistance to desiccation, and more opportunities to find a mate. Airborne pheromones are responsible for aggregations. Another source of aggregation could be the recognition of other C. lectularius bugs through mechanoreceptors located on their antennae. Aggregations are formed and disbanded based on the associated cost and benefits. Females are more often found separate from the aggregation than males. Females are more likely to expand the population range and find new sites. Active female dispersal can account for treatment failures. Males, when found in areas with few females, abandon an aggregation to find a new mate. The males excrete an aggregation pheromone into the air that attracts virgin females and arrests other males.
