= 16S rRNA (adenine1408-N1)-methyltransferase =

Class of enzymes

16S rRNA (adenine^{1408}-N^{1})-methyltransferase

Identifiers
- EC no.: 2.1.1.180

Databases
- IntEnz: IntEnz view
- BRENDA: BRENDA entry
- ExPASy: NiceZyme view
- KEGG: KEGG entry
- MetaCyc: metabolic pathway
- PRIAM: profile
- PDB structures: RCSB PDB PDBe PDBsum
Search
- PMC: articles
- PubMed: articles
- NCBI: proteins

16S rRNA (adenine^{1408}-N^{1})-methyltransferase (EC 2.1.1.180, kanamycin-apramycin resistance methylase, 16S rRNA:m1A1408 methyltransferase, KamB, NpmA, 16S rRNA m1A1408 methyltransferase) is an enzyme with systematic name S-adenosyl-L-methionine:16S rRNA (adenine^{1408}-N^{1})-methyltransferase. This enzyme catalyses the following chemical reaction

S-adenosyl-L-methionine + adenine^{1408} in 16S rRNA $\rightleftharpoons$ S-adenosyl-L-homocysteine + N^{1}-methyladenine^{1408} in 16S rRNA

The enzyme provides a panaminoglycoside resistance through interference with the binding of aminoglycosides.
