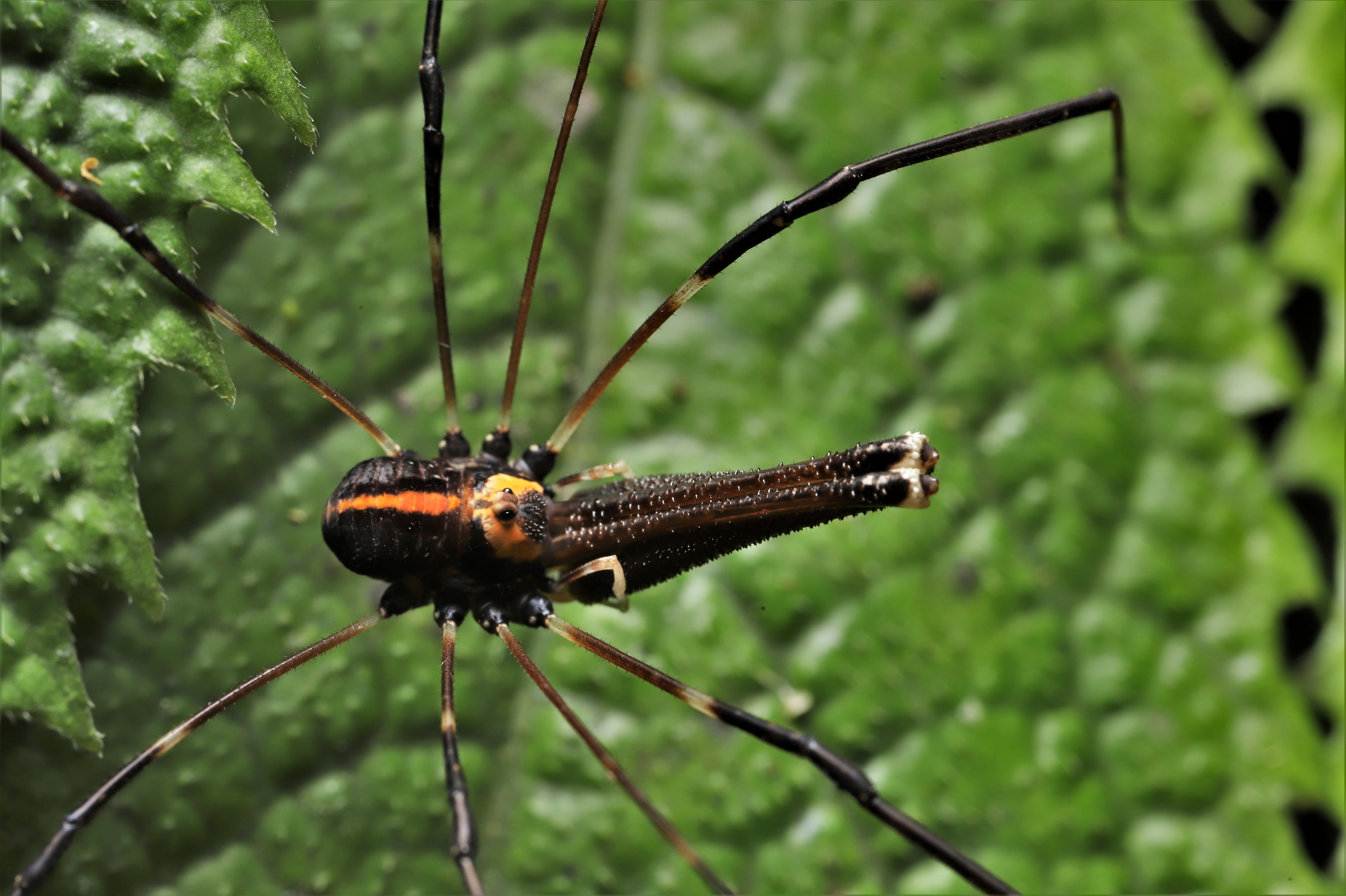
- Male Forsteropsalis pureora
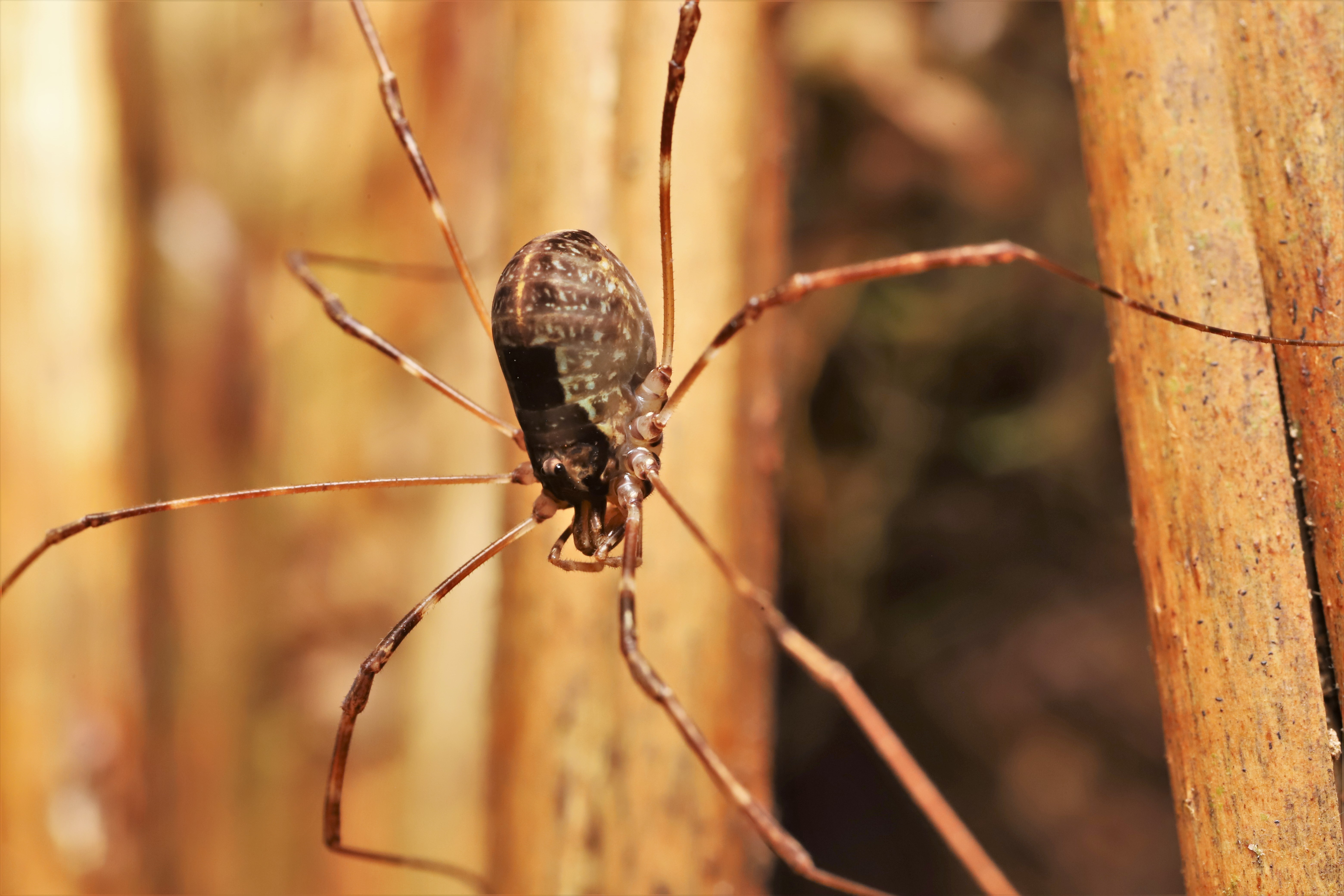
- Female Forsteropsalis pureora

Scientific classification
- Kingdom: Animalia
- Phylum: Arthropoda
- Subphylum: Chelicerata
- Class: Arachnida
- Order: Opiliones
- Family: Neopilionidae
- Genus: Forsteropsalis
- Species: F. pureora

Binomial name
- Forsteropsalis pureora Taylor, 2013

= Forsteropsalis pureora =

Species of long-legged harvestman in the family Neopilionidae

Forsteropsalis pureora is a species of long-legged harvestman in the family, Neopilionidae. This species is endemic to New Zealand, found in the North Island. They are found in native forest, often resting on vegetation or stream banks.

== Description ==
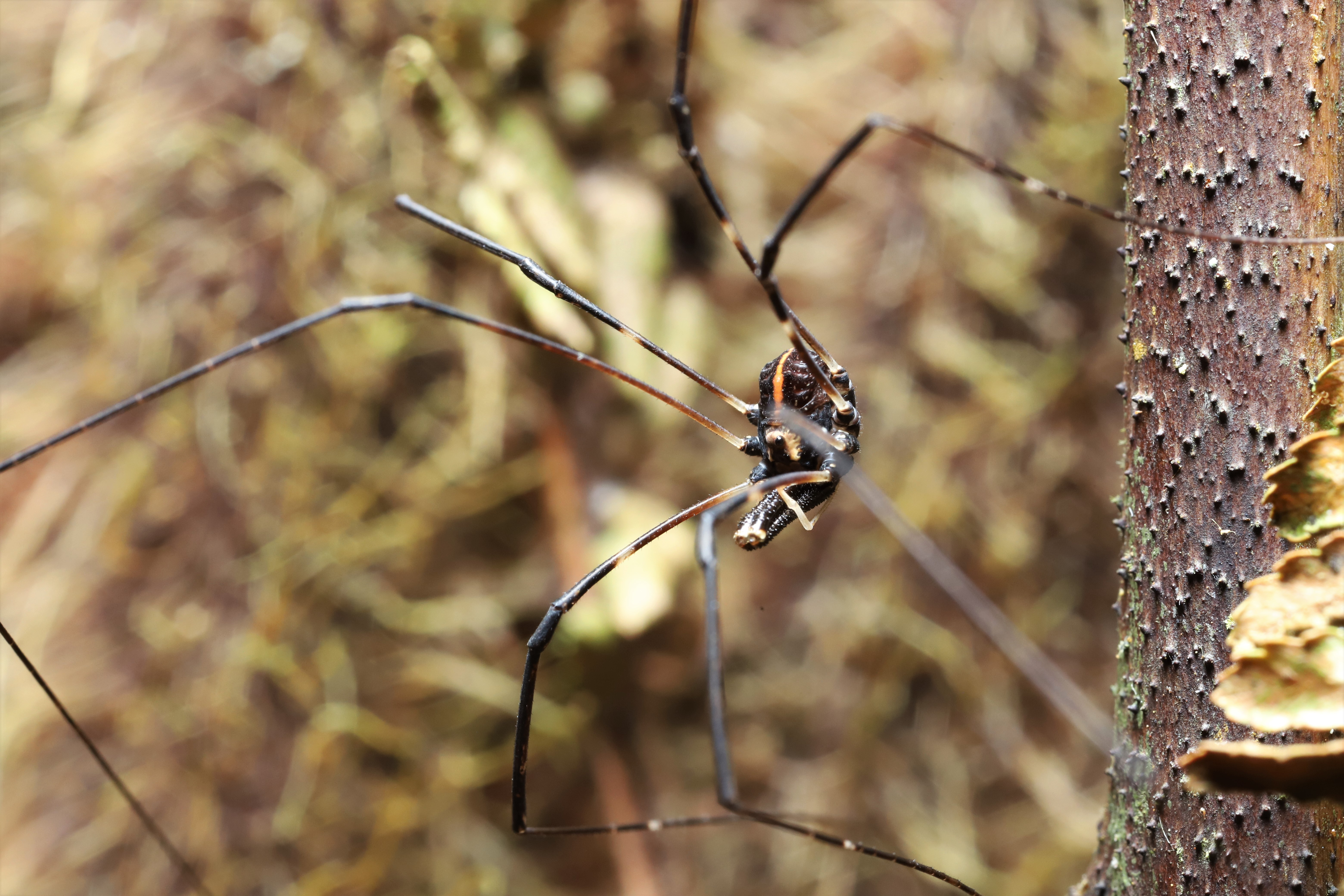
Adult male Forsteropsalis pureora. This is a small-bodied gamma male with small chelicerae.

This species is highly sexually dimorphic, with males and females differing in morphology. Males have enlarged chelicerae used to fight other males in competition. The pinching claw of the chelicera is used to grab and pin down the opponent. Males may be one of three morphs that differ in chelicerae size, chelicerae shape, and body size. Males and females also differ in color, known as sexual dichromatism. Males are brown to black, with an orange stripe running dorsally down the body. There is also an orange horseshoe-shaped marking around the eyes. In the original species description, these markings are inaccurately described as white from the aged bleached specimens in ethanol. The orange markings may range from dull yellow-orange to dark red-orange. Females are more cryptic in color with a mottled brown and black pattern and light yellow-orange markings. Juveniles have the same coloration as mature females.

== Diet and predators ==
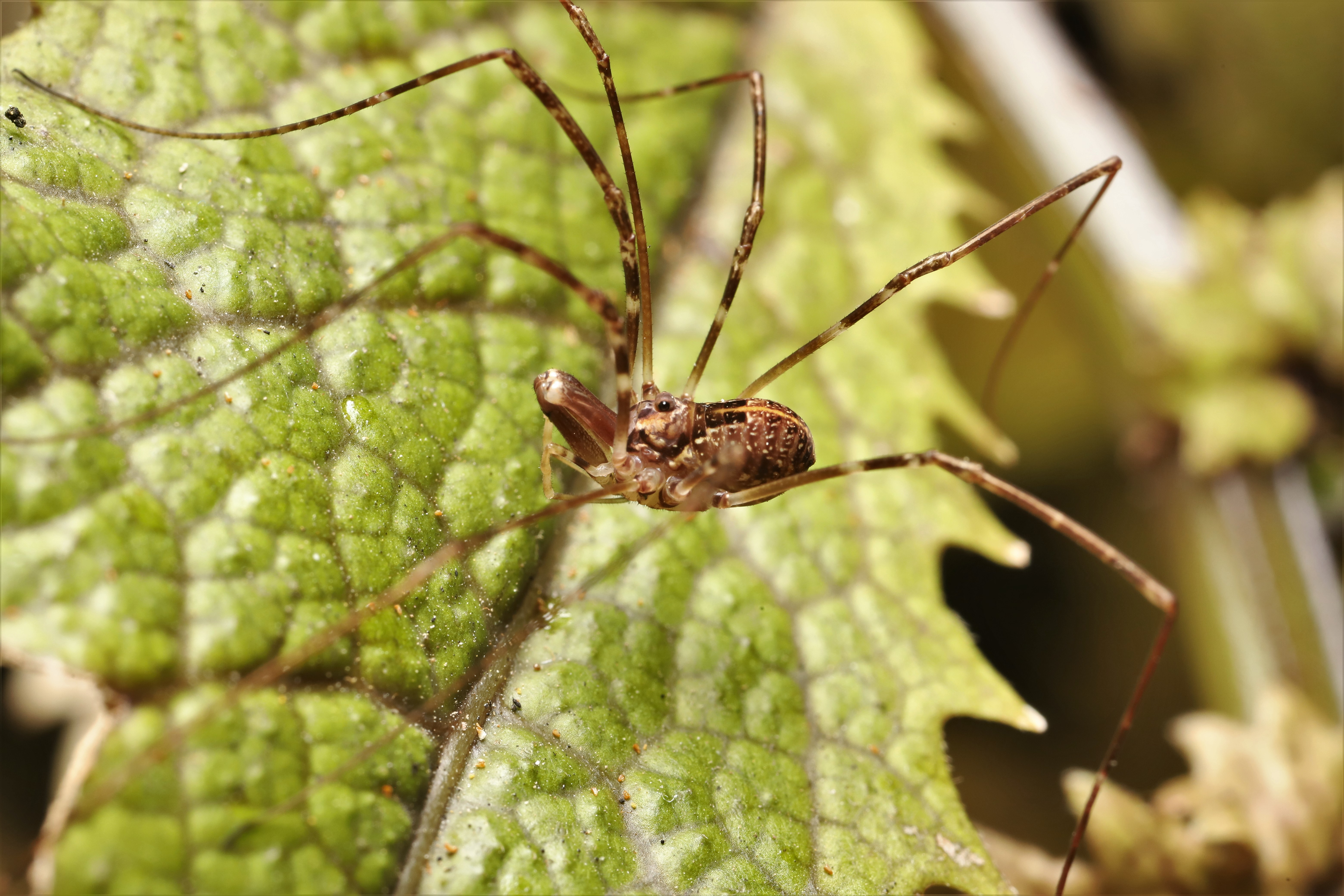
A subadult male Forsteropsalis pureora

This species is a generalist opportunistic omnivore. In the wild, they have been observed eating a variety of insect prey (e.g., wētā, flies, beetles, dragonflies, caterpillars, adult moths, stink bugs, and cockroaches), spiders, and other invertebrates (e.g., amphipods), both captured live and scavenged. They are highly opportunistic and have been found resting under spider webs collecting discarded pieces of prey as they fall from the web.

New Zealand harvestmen are eaten by various vertebrate species, including introduced mammals (possums, hedgehogs, rats, stoats), bats, birds, frogs, tuatara, and fish (kōaro). Invertebrate predators such as spiders also prey upon harvestmen and cannibalism occurs within the Neopilionidae. Forsteropsalis pureora has been observed being eaten by Uliodon sp. vagrant spiders and Cambridgea sp. sheetweb spiders.
