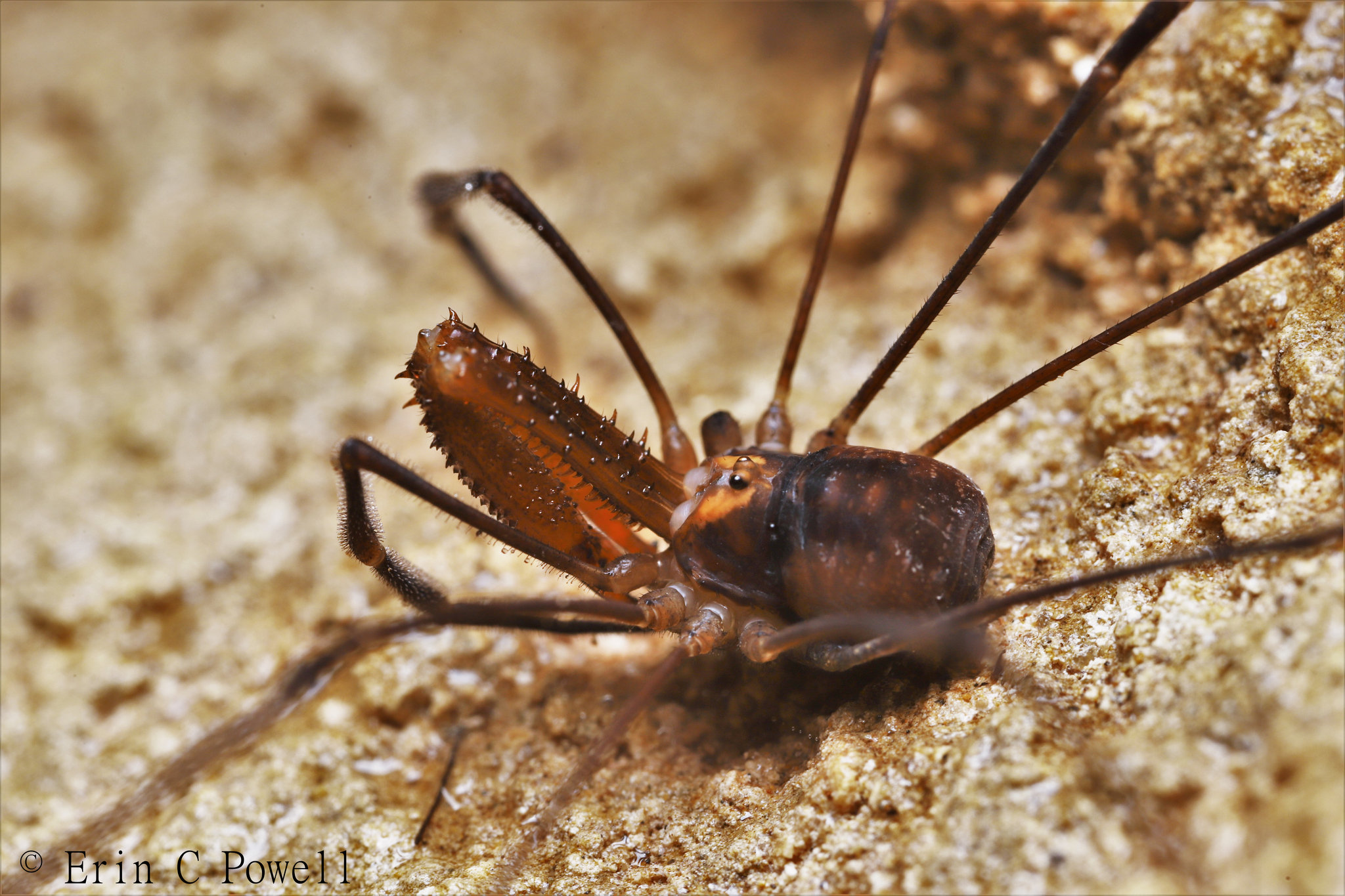
- Male

Scientific classification
- Kingdom: Animalia
- Phylum: Arthropoda
- Subphylum: Chelicerata
- Class: Arachnida
- Order: Opiliones
- Family: Neopilionidae
- Genus: Ungoliant
- Species: U. photophaga

Binomial name
- Ungoliant photophaga (Taylor and Probert, 2014)

Synonyms
- Forsteropsalis photophaga Taylor & Probert, 2014

= Ungoliant photophaga =

Species of long-legged harvestman in the family Neopilionidae

Ungoliant photophaga, also known as the glow-worm hunter, is a species of long-legged harvestman in the family Neopilionidae. This species is endemic to New Zealand, found in North Island caves in the vicinity of Waitomo. The name "photophaga" comes from their habit of feeding on the luminescent larvae, pupae, and adults of the New Zealand glow-worm Arachnocampa luminosa. Until 2025, it was recovered in the genus Forsteropsalis.

== Taxonomy ==
Both Aola Richards and Meyer-Rochow and Liddle had previously recorded a species of harvestman in caves at Waitomo feeding on glow-worms which they identified as Megalopsalis tumida (now considered a synonym of Ungoliant fabulosa). Further examination of specimens from the cave revealed this harvestman was in fact two new species of Forsteropsalis. These were named and described in 2014 by Chris Taylor and Anna Probert as Forsteropsalis bona and F. photophaga.

The specific epithet photophaga derived from the Greek phos (light) and phagein (to eat), references its habit of feeding on luminescent glow-worms. The holotype specimen, collected in Gardners Gut Cave System, Waitomo, in 1977, is deposited in the collections of Te Papa; six paratypes were collected from other cave systems in the vicinity of Waitomo and Te Kūiti between 1958 and 2013.

In 2025, the species was moved to the new genus Ungoliant after the genus Forsteropsalis was recovered as non-monophyletic.

== Description ==
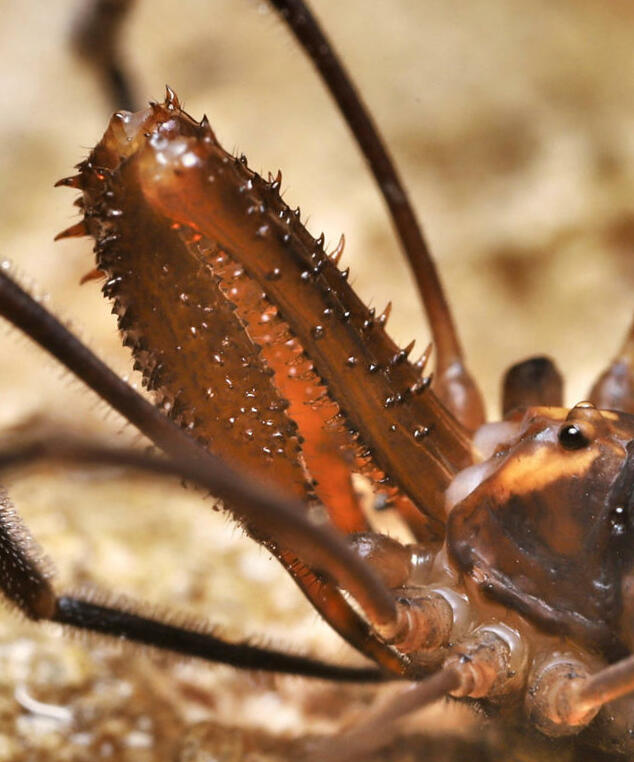
Male Ungoliant photophaga showing denticles on the chelicerae

At the time of description, all known specimens of then F. photophaga were male. The species is brown in colour, with pale yellow longitudinal stripes. Body length without legs is 3.5–6.1 mm and the legs themselves are around 25 mm long.

Harvestmen in the genus Forsteropsalis are highly sexually dimorphic, with males and females differing in morphology: males have enlarged chelicerae used to fight other males in competition, with a pinching claw used to grab and pin down the opponent. U. photophaga males have long orange-brown chelicerae: segment I is 3.4–6.5 mm long, and segment II 4.9–9.1 mm. A distinguishing feature of this species is rows of large denticles on the second segment of these chelicerae, not seen in any other New Zealand Neopilionidae.

== Diet and predators ==
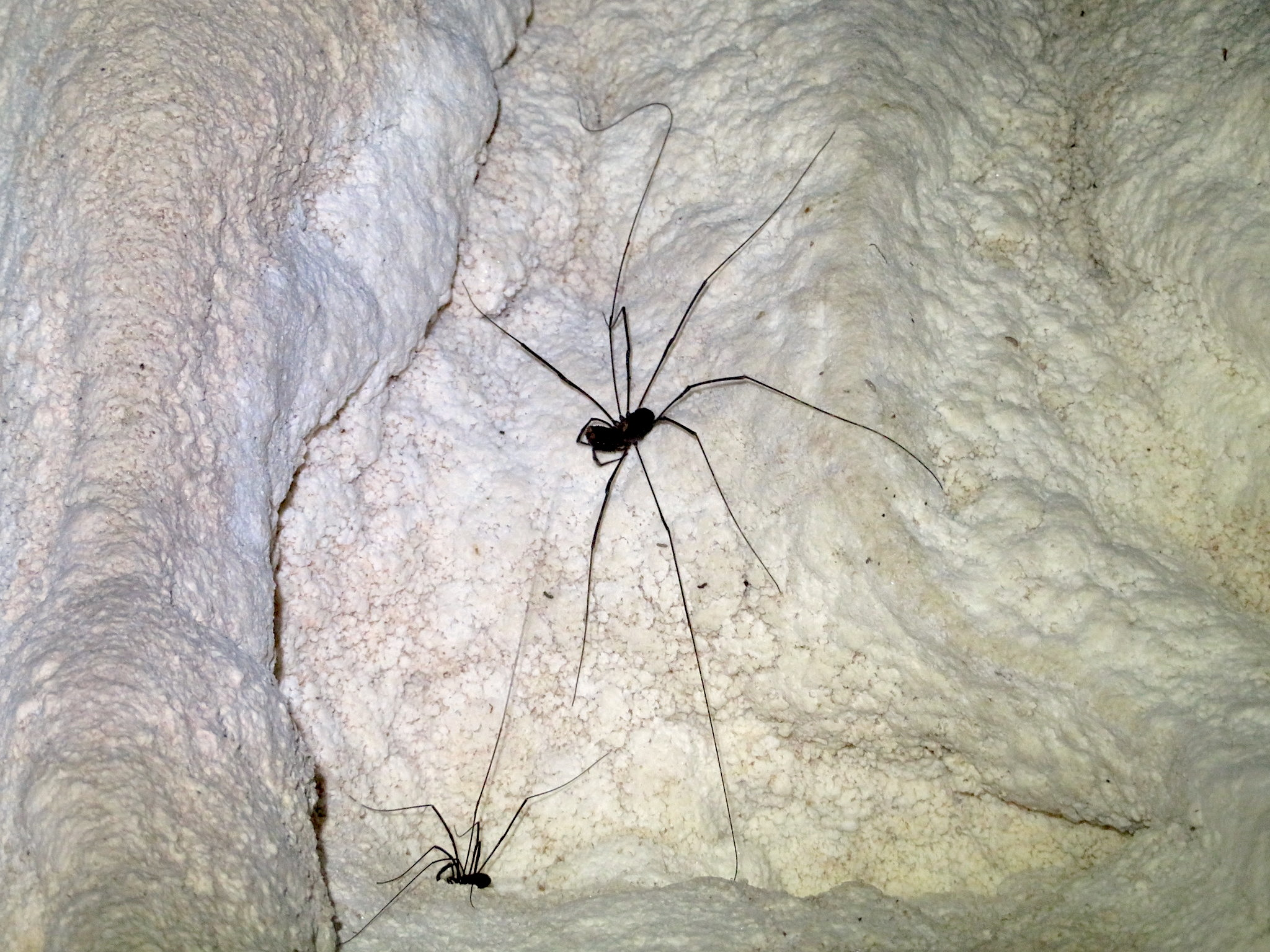
Ungoliant photophaga in a cave in Pirongia Forest Park

The New Zealand glow-worm (Arachnocampa luminosa) is a species of midge, whose larvae luminesce to lure flying insects into sticky silken threads. Glow-worms are notably abundant in Waitomo cave systems, and the Glowworm Caves are an international tourist attraction. Harvestmen species like U. photophaga and U. bona have been observed extracting glow-worm larvae from their silken nests on the cave roof, without being entangled in sticky threads. Both males and females of U. photophaga have plumose setae on their pedipalps, the adhesive properties of which may help capture glow-worm larvae, pupae, and adults.

New Zealand harvestmen are eaten by various vertebrate species, including introduced mammals (possums, hedgehogs, rats, stoats), bats, birds, frogs, tuatara, and fish (kōaro). Invertebrate predators such as spiders also prey upon harvestmen and cannibalism occurs within the Neopilionidae. Like other Eupnoi harvestmen, U. photophaga can autotomise legs to escape potential predators, breaking the leg off at a pre-determined breakage plane between the trochanter and femur. New Zealand Neopilionidae will also often employ thanatosis, or playing dead, when disturbed. Parasitic mites are frequently found attached to New Zealand harvestmen, including at least one undescribed species of Microtrombidiidae found on U. photophaga.
