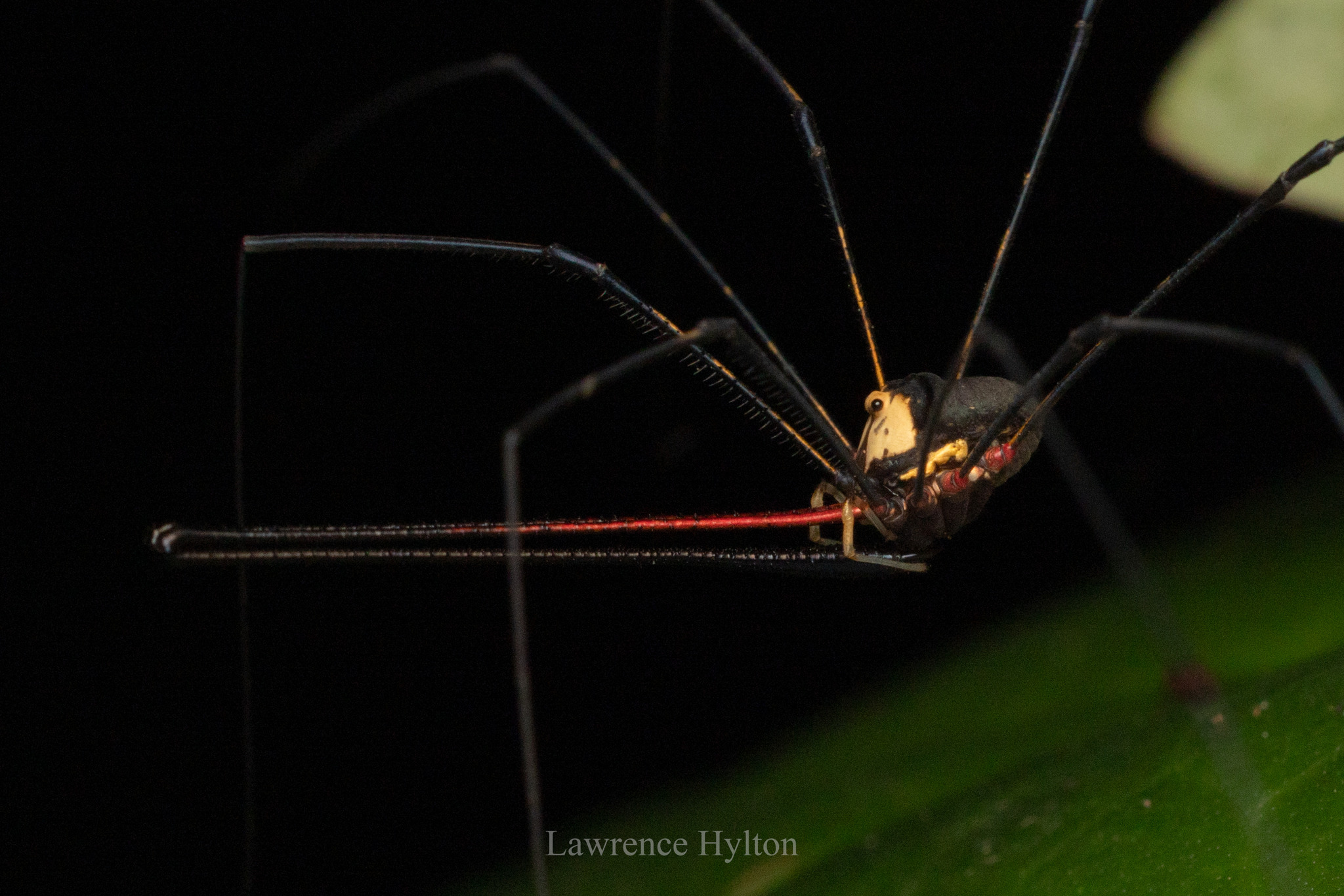
- Major male of Neopantopsalis pentheter
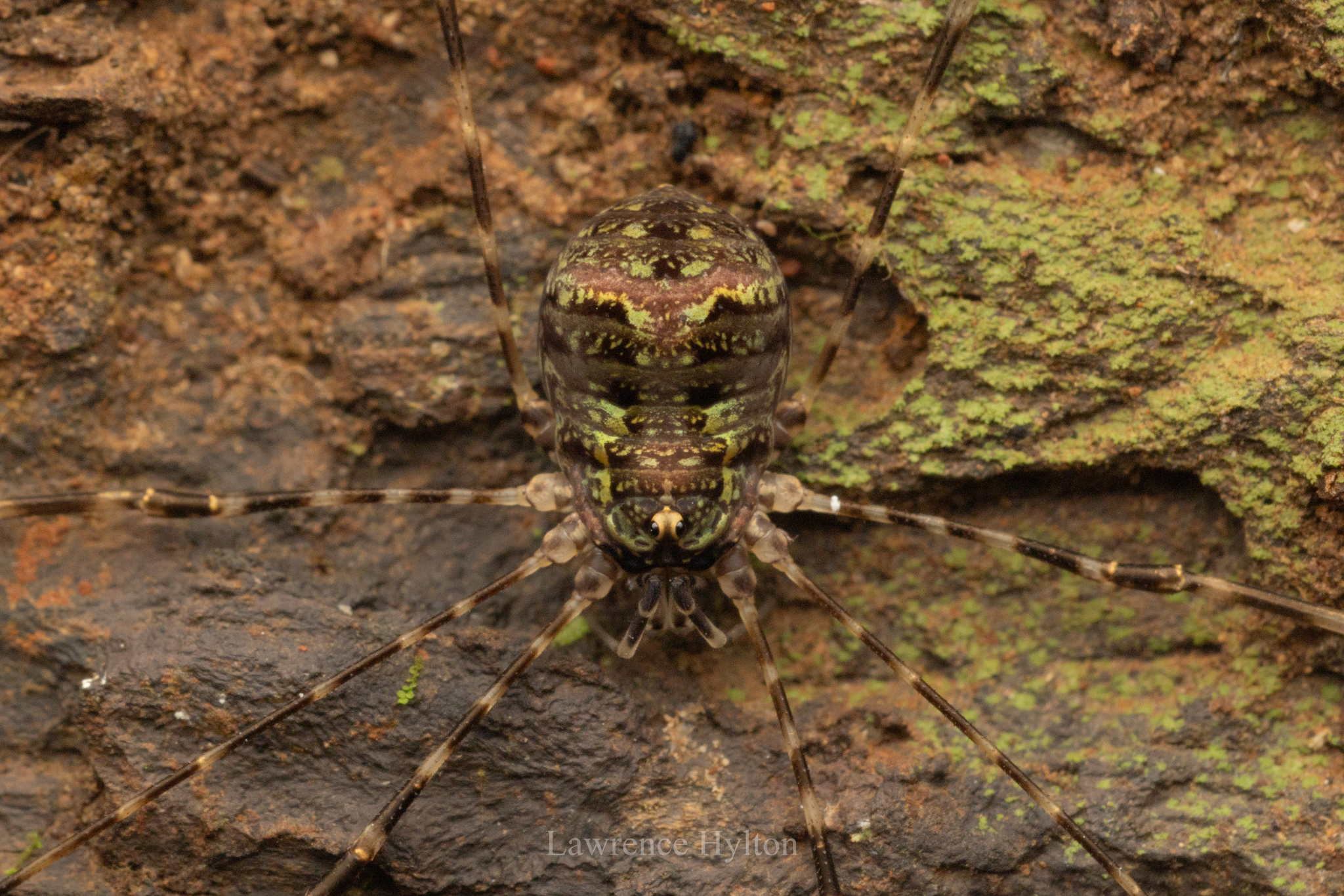
- Female of Neopantopsalis pentheter

Scientific classification
- Kingdom: Animalia
- Phylum: Arthropoda
- Subphylum: Chelicerata
- Class: Arachnida
- Order: Opiliones
- Family: Neopilionidae
- Subfamily: Enantiobuninae
- Genus: Neopantopsalis; Taylor & Hunt, 2009

Type species
- Neopantopsalis quasimodo Taylor & Hunt, 2009

Species
- See Taxonomy

= Neopantopsalis =

Genus of harvestmen

Neopantopsalis is a genus of harvestmen arachnids in the family Neopilionidae, found in Queensland and northern New South Wales, Australia.

== Description ==
At least three species of the genus, Neopantopsalis pentheter, Neopantopsalis psile and Neopantopsalis quasimodo, have records of male dimorphism, with the existence of two morhologically distinct male forms, the minor and major males. Minor males are much smaller in size and display less prominent secondary sexual characters than major males, with shorter chelicerae and smaller sized hypertrophied proventral spine rows on femur I, notably.

Both male morphs also possess a penis with a long, oblong, dorsoventrally flattened glans that differentiates them from the remaining genera attributed to Monoscutidae at the time of the original description. Major males of the genus are themselves further distinguished from these by a raised hump on the dorsal prosomal plate and the aforementioned proventral row of greatly hypertrophied spines on leg I.

For the species other than the three previously mentioned, no minor male specimens are known at the time of their original description, although the number of specimens attributed to them is not sufficient to dismiss their potential occurrence.

== Taxonomy ==
The following species are recognised in the genus Neopantopsalis:

- N. camelus (Forster, 1949)
- N. continentalis (Roewer 1923)
- N. pentheter Taylor & Hunt, 2009
- N. psile Taylor & Hunt, 2009
- N. quasimodo Taylor & Hunt, 2009
- N. thaumatopoios Taylor & Hunt, 2009
