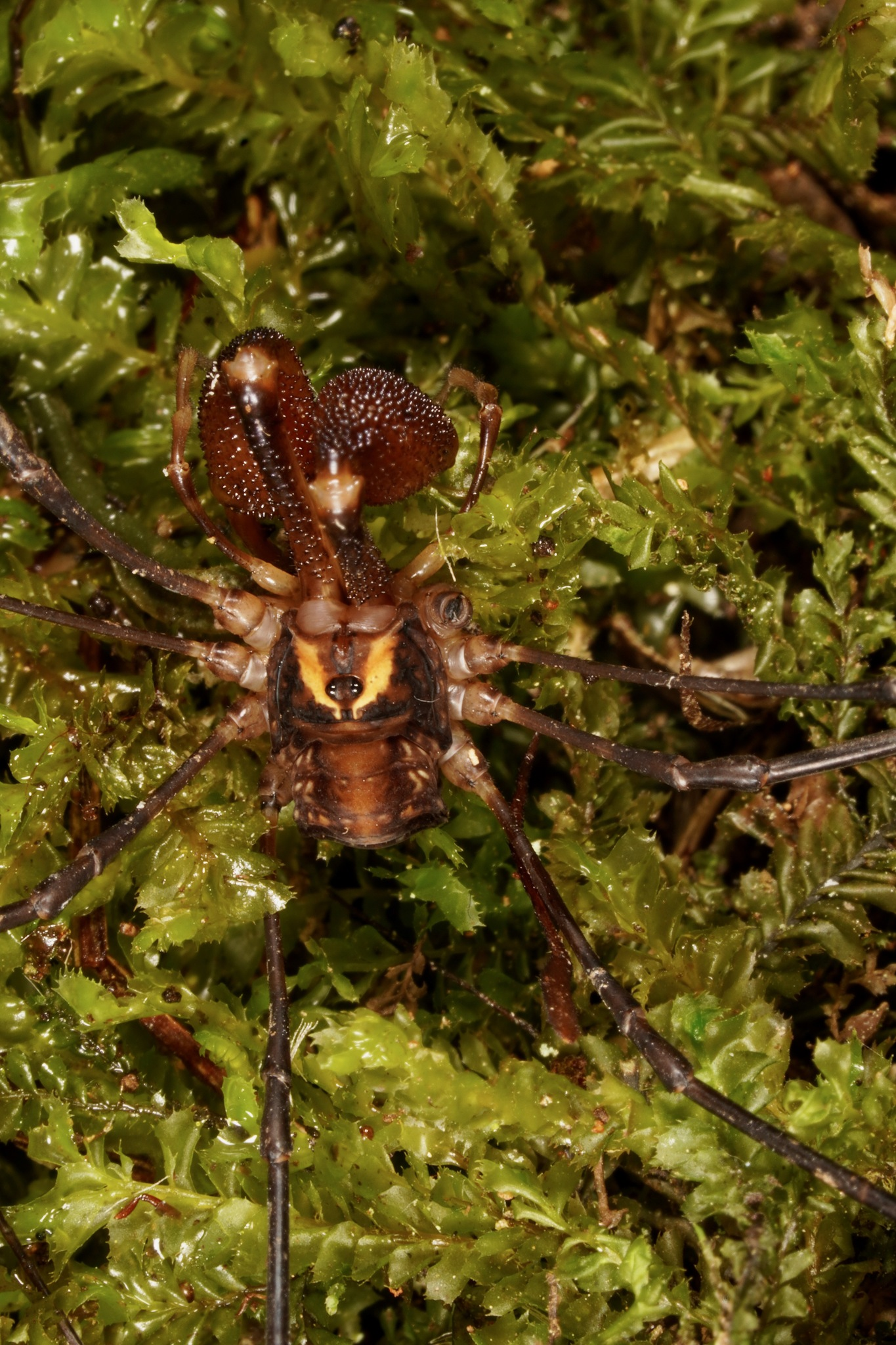
- Ungoliant bona
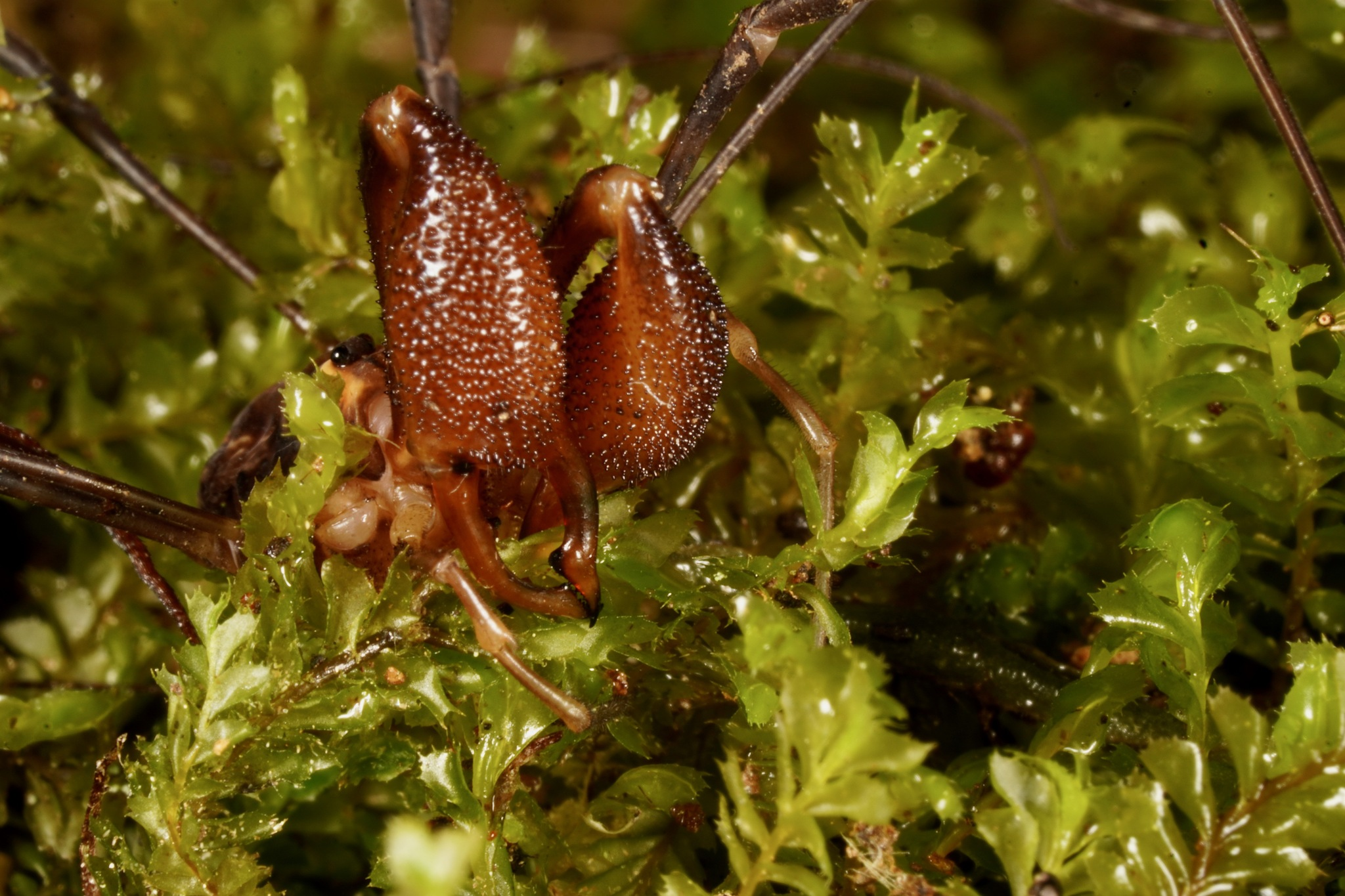
- View of the chelicerae of Ungoliant bona

Scientific classification
- Kingdom: Animalia
- Phylum: Arthropoda
- Subphylum: Chelicerata
- Class: Arachnida
- Order: Opiliones
- Family: Neopilionidae
- Subfamily: Enantiobuninae
- Genus: Ungoliant; Taylor, 2025

Type species
- Forsteropsalis photophaga Taylor & Probert, 2014

Species
- See Taxonomy

= Ungoliant (harvestman) =

Genus of harvestmen

Ungoliant is a genus of harvestmen arachnids in the family Neopilionidae and endemic to New Zealand. Species now attributed to this genus were previously attributed to Forsteropsalis, being moved after the latter was recovered as non-monophyletic.

== Taxonomy ==
The following species are assigned to this genus:

- U. bona (Taylor & Probert, 2014)
- U. fabulosa (Phillipps & Grimmett, 1932)
- U. photophaga (Taylor & Probert, 2014)
- U. turneri (Marples, 1944)
