= Neopilio =

Scientific classification
- Domain: Eukaryota
- Kingdom: Animalia
- Phylum: Arthropoda
- Subphylum: Chelicerata
- Class: Arachnida
- Order: Opiliones
- Family: Neopilionidae
- Subfamily: Neopilioninae
- Genus: Neopilio; Lawrence, 1931

Subfamily of harvestmen/daddy longlegs

Neopilio is a genus of harvestmen in the family Neopilionidae. It is the sole member of the monotypic subfamily Neopilioninae.

The following species are recognised in the genus Neopilio:

- Neopilio australis Lawrence, 1931
- Neopilio inferi Lotz, 2011
