= Intromittent organ =

External organ of a male organism that is specialized to deliver sperm during copulation

An intromittent organ is any external organ of a male organism that is specialized to deliver sperm during copulation. Intromittent organs are found most often in terrestrial species, as most non-mammalian aquatic species fertilize their eggs externally, although there are exceptions. For many species in the animal kingdom, the male intromittent organ is a hallmark characteristic of internal fertilization.

== Species with intromittent organs ==
=== Invertebrates ===
==== Molluscs ====
Male cephalopods have a specialized arm, the hectocotylus, which is inserted into the female's mantle cavity to deliver a spermatophore during copulation. In some species, the hectocotylus breaks off inside the female's mantle cavity; in others, it can be used repeatedly to copulate with different females.

==== Arachnids ====
In spiders, the intromittent organs are the male pedipalps, even though these are not primarily sexual organs, but serve as indirect mating organs; in the male the pedipalps have hollow, clubbed tips, often of complex internal anatomy. The sexually mature male typically deposits semen from the gonopore onto a specially woven silken mat, then sucks the emission into his palpal bulbs. In mating, he inserts the openings of the pedipalps in turn into the epigyne, the female external genital structure.

In Solifugae, sperm transfer is also indirect; the male deposits a spermatophore on the ground, picks it up in his chelicerae, then inserts it into the female's genital opening.

In Opiliones (harvestmen), males have a structure called a penis, which is not present in other arachnids.

==== Millipedes ====
In most millipedes, sperm transfer is performed by one or two pairs of modified legs called gonopods, which are often on the seventh body segment. During mating, a male bends his body to collect a spermatophore from the genital pore of his third segment, and inserts it into the female's body. Gonopods vary greatly among millipedes, and are often used to identify species.

==== Insects ====
Male insects possess an aedeagus, whose function is directly analogous to that of the vertebrate penis. Some insects also have claspers. Male moths have an additional organ called the juxta, which supports the aedeagus. These however are generalisations, and insect genitalia vary enormously in anatomy and in application. For example, some insects, most notoriously the Cimicidae and some Strepsiptera, practise traumatic insemination, in which the intromittent organ pierces the abdominal wall and the semen is deposited into the hemocoel.

=== Vertebrates ===
==== Fish ====
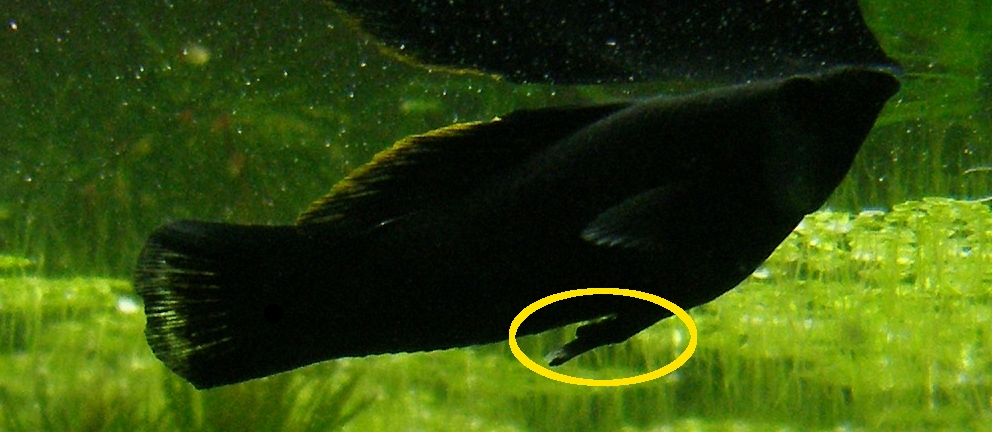
Gonopodium of a black molly (Poecilia sphenops).

In male members of Chondrichthyes (sharks and rays), as well as now-extinct placoderms, the pelvic fins bear specialized claspers. During copulation, one clasper is inserted into the female's cloaca, and sperm is flushed by the male's body through a groove into the female.

Members of Poeciliidae are small fishes that give birth to live young. In males, the anal fin is shaped into a grooved, rod-shaped organ called a gonopodium used to deliver sperm to females.

==== Tetrapods ====
In lizards and snakes, males possess paired hemipenes, each of which is usually grooved to allow sperm transport and spiny or rough at the tip to allow firm attachment to the female. To become erect, a hemipenis is evaginated (turned inside out) through muscle action and engorgement with blood. Only one is inserted into the female's cloaca at a time. In reptiles, the phallus has an open sulcus instead of a closed urethral tube.

In some turtles, crocodiles, some birds, and in all mammals, males possess a penis centered along the midline of the body. During copulation, it becomes erect due to engorgement with blood or lymph, though in many animals it also contains a stiff or even bony support structure. When not in use, its soft penile tissue is usually flaccid, and depending on the species, may be retracted into the body. The anatomy of the penis varies widely according to species. However, the penis evolved only once in the evolutionary history of amniotes. In male caecilians, the intromittent organ is called the phallodeum.

===== Mammals =====
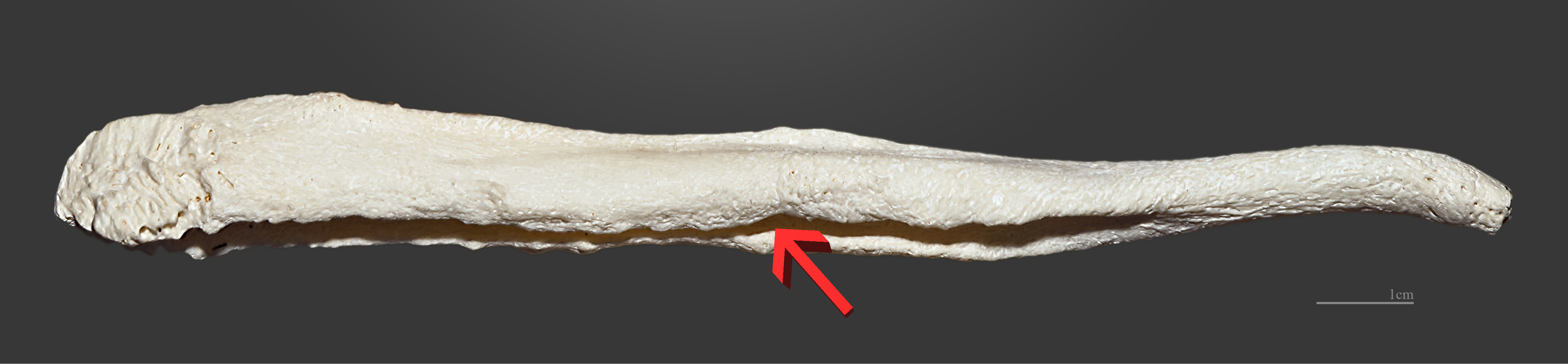
Baculum of a dog (Canis lupus familiaris).

All male mammals have a penis. Eulipotyphlans, bats, rodents, carnivorans, and most primates (but not humans) have a bone called the baculum or os penis that permanently stiffens the penis. During copulation, blood engorges the already-stiff penis resulting in a full erection.

Unlike marsupials and monotremes, male placental mammals expel urine from the bladder through the penis via the urethra. Monotreme penes are variously unusual; the platypus has a penis with a two-lobed (bifid) tip though the whole shaft is inserted in mating, possibly to engage both of the uterine branches, but the echidna's penis actually has four heads, only two of which function at a time. Both monotremes and marsupial moles are the only mammals with internal penises, located on the cloacal wall instead of outside of it as in other mammals.

Most marsupial penises are variously forked or split into two in such ways that they resemble hemipenes; in different marsupial species their forms are characteristic enough to be taxonomically important.

=== Birds ===
Although birds reproduce through internal fertilization, 97% of males completely lack a functional intromittent organ. For the 3% of birds with an intromittent organ, copulation occurs through brief insertion of the male organ into the vagina before ejaculation. Alternatively, for the vast majority of birds—a group comprising nearly 10,000 species—sperm transfer occurs by cloacal contact between the male and female, in a maneuver known as the "cloacal kiss". Birds are one of the only groups which reproduce through internal fertilization but have repeatedly lost the intromittent organ.

Male ostriches have a conical shaped penis that is wider at the base.

A functional intromittent organ is known to be present in most species of Paleognathae and Anseriformes. The Anseriformes (waterfowl) are a particularly interesting group to study given the high variability in intromittent organ morphology. Waterfowl intromittent organs range greatly in length, are often characterized by surface elaborations (both spines and grooves), and at times spiral counter-clockwise. Male ducks have a penis that is coiled along the ventral wall of the cloaca when flaccid and which may have an elaborate spiral shape when erect. Waterfowl intromittent organ variation is most likely due to an intersexual arms race resulting from a mating system in which forced extra-pair copulations are frequent.
