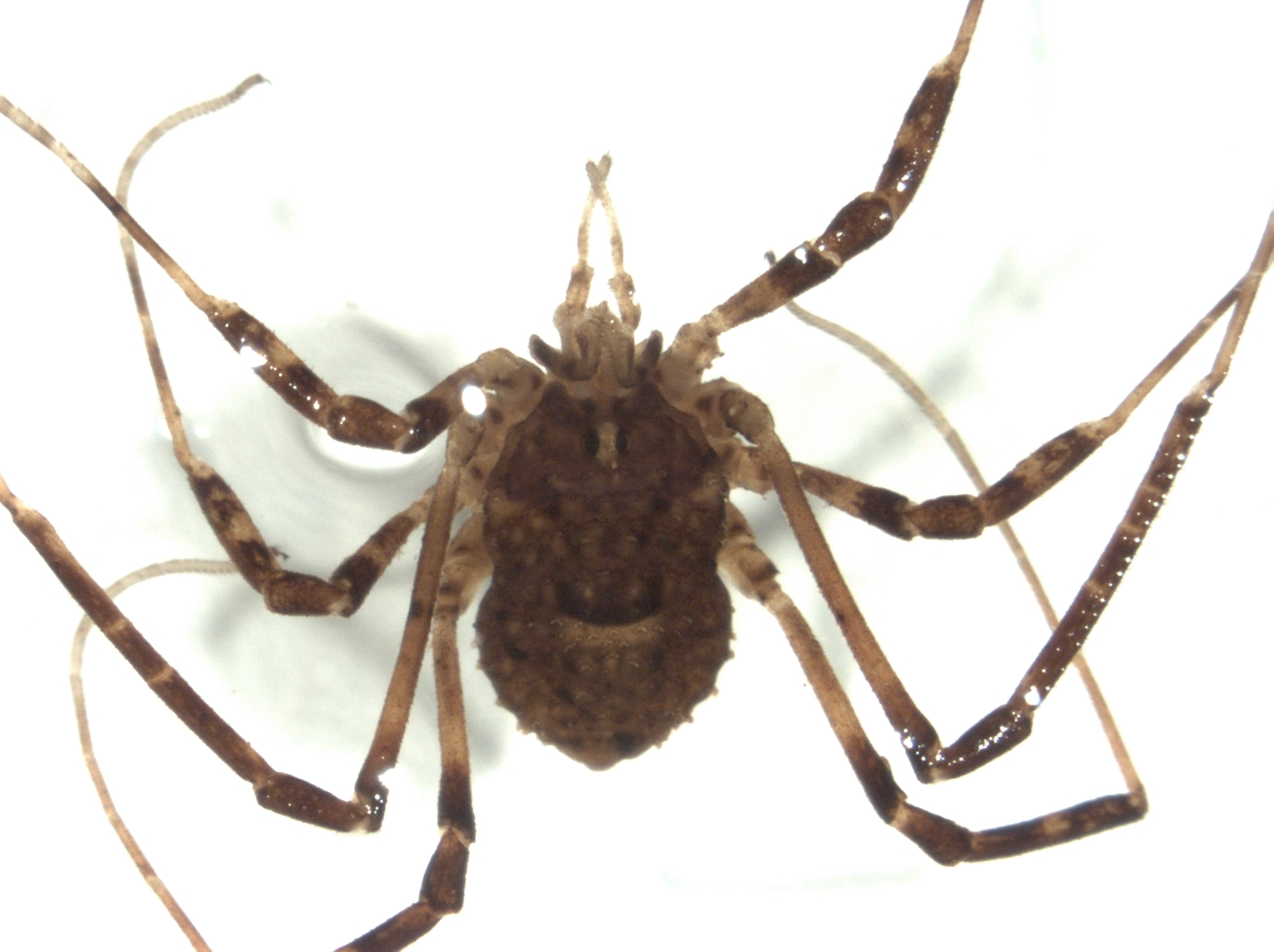

Scientific classification
- Kingdom: Animalia
- Phylum: Arthropoda
- Subphylum: Chelicerata
- Class: Arachnida
- Order: Opiliones
- Family: Neopilionidae
- Subfamily: Enantiobuninae
- Genus: Monoscutum; Forster, 1948
- Species: M. titirangiense

Binomial name
- Monoscutum titirangiense Forster, 1948

Synonyms
- Monoscutum titirangiensis Forster, 1948

= Monoscutum =

Genus of arachnids

Monoscutum is a genus of harvestmen (Opiliones) in the family Neopilionidae. The genus is monotypic, containing a single species, Monoscutum titirangiense, which is endemic to New Zealand.

== Description ==
In the original description, Forster described the genus and species as below:

Eye mound spherical, clearly removed from the anterior margin of the carapace; with single median tubercle rising anterior to the eyes, Cephalothorax and all tergites fused, transverse grooves absent; but divided behind eye mound into areas by transverse lines of small pustular papillae. Third such area with median pair of spines. Rest of body without spines. Sternites fused, hard, divided by faint transverse grooves which do not reach the sides. Spiracles hidden. Mandibles short, basal segment armed below with single forwardly directed spine. Pedipalp longer than body, Patella with well-developed inner distal apophysis. Tarsus nearly twice as long as tibia and terminated by simple smooth claw. Legs short. 2, 4, 3, 1. Tarsal segments, more than 20.

Body: Eye mound spherical, placed one half its diameter from the anterior margin of cephalothorax; armed with single median blunt tubercle, rising from between and slightly in front of the eyes, and directed forward. Anterior margin of cephalothorax with one median indentation, enclosing the chelicerae, and two lateral indentations on each side enclosing coxae I and II respectively. Cephalothorax and sternites as in generic description, with eight transverse rows of papillae behind eye mound. Sternites as in generic description, smooth, with papillae or spines. Genital operculum large, widening distally, sparsely covered with small black setae.
Chelicerae: Basal segment armed below with single, small, forwardly directed spine, apart from which the chelicerae are smooth. Fingers crossed when closed; cutting edges with numerous small uniform-size teeth.
Pedipalp: All segments covered with numerous small black setae. Patella with prominent inner distal apophysis. Tarsus slender, nearly twice as long as tibia. Claw, distinct, smooth. Legs: 2. 4, 3, 1. Coxae smooth, Trochanter I-III with one antero-lateral and one postero-lateral spine. Trochanter IV with only one antero-lateral spine. Remaining segments smooth. All segments clothed with small black setae. Tarsal segments 21, 60, 20, 22.

Colour: Body light-brown except for a median black area surrounding the two spines on the tergum, behind which extends a lighter area. All legs and appendages uniform light-brown. Eye mound grey, eyes black.

Forster's type description appears to be based on male individuals only. Female individuals are more rugose, have more denticles on their opisthosoma, lack a denticle pattern (while male specimens typically have rows), and have large median tubercules on their third segments. The species can be distinguished from the genera Acihasta and Templar due to the presence of complex ornamentation covering the species' dorsum.

== Taxonomy ==
Both the genus and species were described by the same paper by Ray Forster in 1948, who used the spelling Monoscutum titirangiensis. The holotype was collected by Forster himself from Titirangi, Auckland, on 13 December 1945, and is kept at Te Papa. The name was amended to Monoscutum titirangiense by Vladimír Šilhavý in 1970. The species was redescribed in 2008 by Christopher Taylor, including the first description of the female of the species.

Phylogenetic analysis indicated the closest relatives to Monoscutum are the genera Templar, Megalopsalis and Mangatangi.

== Distribution ==
The species is endemic to New Zealand.

== Gallery ==
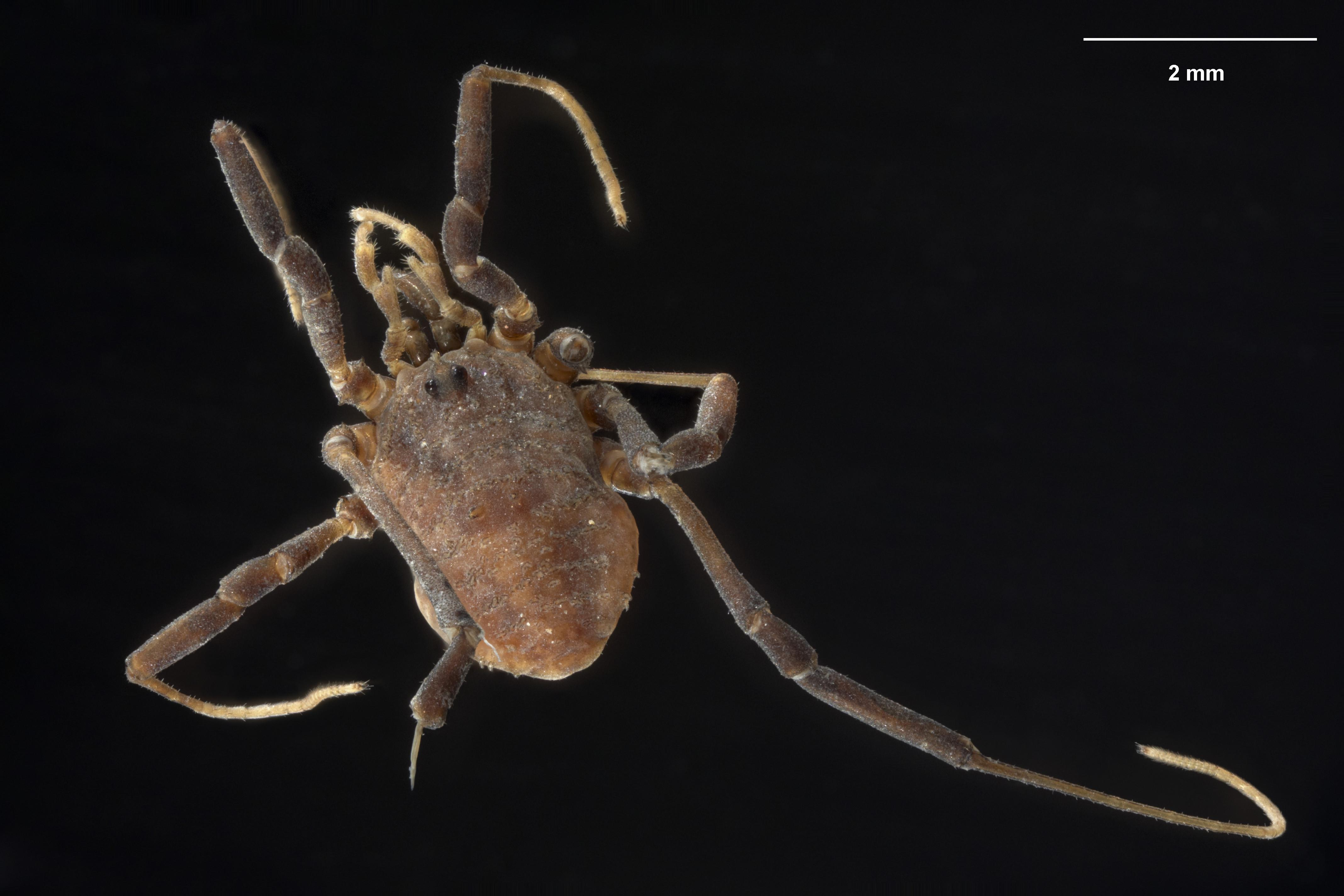
Holotype

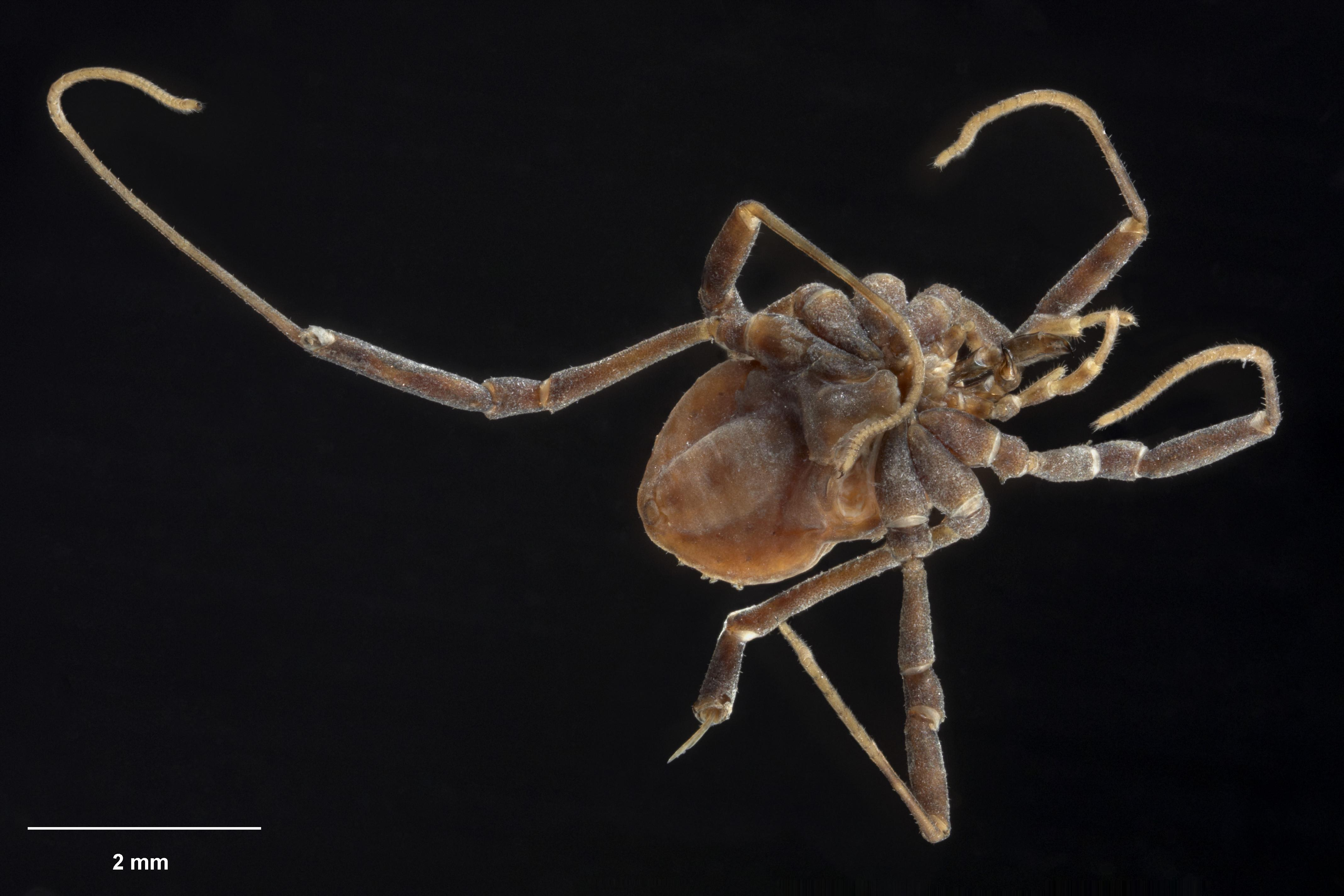
Underside view of holotype

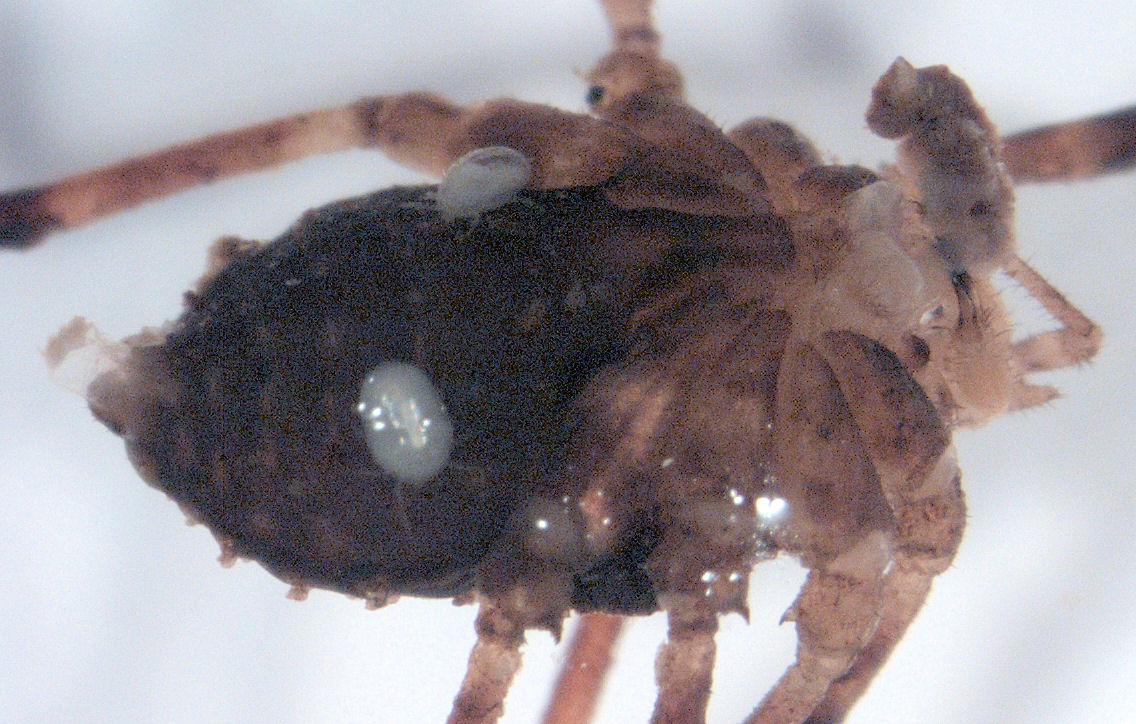
Mites attached to the underside of a Monoscutum
