= Acihasta =

Scientific classification
- Kingdom: Animalia
- Phylum: Arthropoda
- Subphylum: Chelicerata
- Class: Arachnida
- Order: Opiliones
- Family: Neopilionidae
- Subfamily: Enantiobuninae
- Genus: Acihasta; Forster, 1948
- Species: A. salebrosa

Binomial name
- Acihasta salebrosa Forster, 1948

Genus of arachnids

Acihasta is a genus of harvestmen (Opiliones) found in New Zealand. The genus is monotypic, containing a single species, Acihasta salebrosa, which is endemic to Manawatāwhi / Three Kings Islands.

== Description ==
Achiasta salebrosa has spherical eye mounds, and a coarsely granulated spine and eye mound. The species has a deep median indentation of its cephalothorax, which encloses basal portions of chelicerae and pedipalp. The species' body is tan and dark brown in colour, with white and gold speaks over its body, including on its spines and transverse granular lines. It can be distinguished due to the species' opisthosoma having large flanking spines on the lateral margins of its dorsum.

== Taxonomy ==
Both the genus and species were described by the same paper by Ray Forster in 1948. The description was based on a single specimen collected by Graham Turbott from Great Island in the Three Kings Group in April 1946. The holotype is kept at the Auckland War Memorial Museum. When describing the genera Achiasta and Monoscutum, Forster found them difficult to place, and decided to create a subfamily to contain these, Monoscutinae. Monoscutinae was synonymised with the Enantiobuninae subfamily of Neopilionidae in 2013.

Phylogenetic analysis indicated the closest relatives to Acihasta are the genera Monoscutum and Australiscutum.

== Distribution ==
The species is endemic to the Manawatāwhi / Three Kings Islands, northwest of mainland New Zealand.
