= Opiliones penis =

Penis of an arachnid

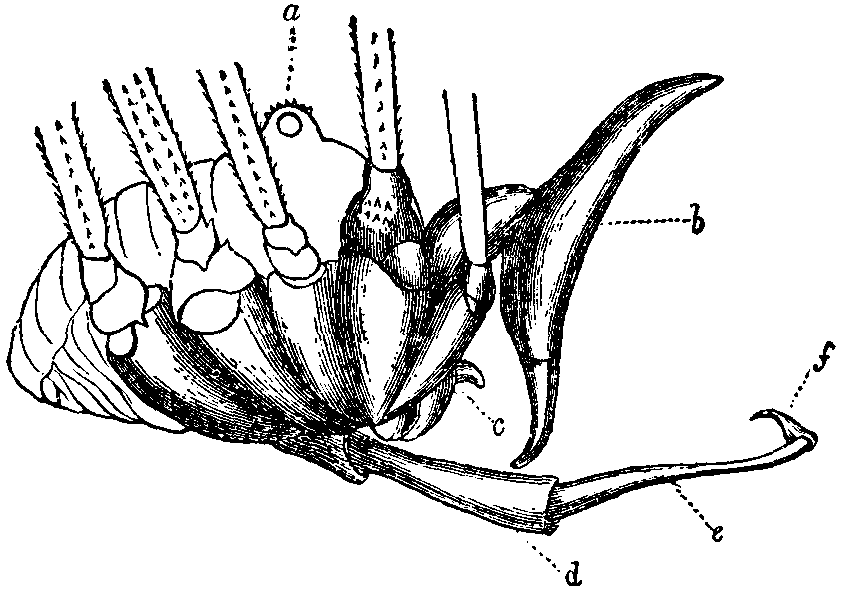
Anatomy of Phalangium cornutum. d, Sheath of penis. e, penis. f, glans.

The penis of the Opiliones (harvestmen) is an intromittent organ that is not present in other arachnids. It consists of a long shaft (the truncus) and a terminal capsule called a glans, containing a stylus and ejaculatory duct. It may have from one to three muscles, or none as in the specialized lineage Grassatores, where the penis is operated by haemolymph pressure. In some members of the Cyphophthalmi, the structure has been termed a "spermatopositor".

This denomination refers to a superficial similarity (analogy) with vertebrate penises and does not have any phylogenetic relationship with it.
