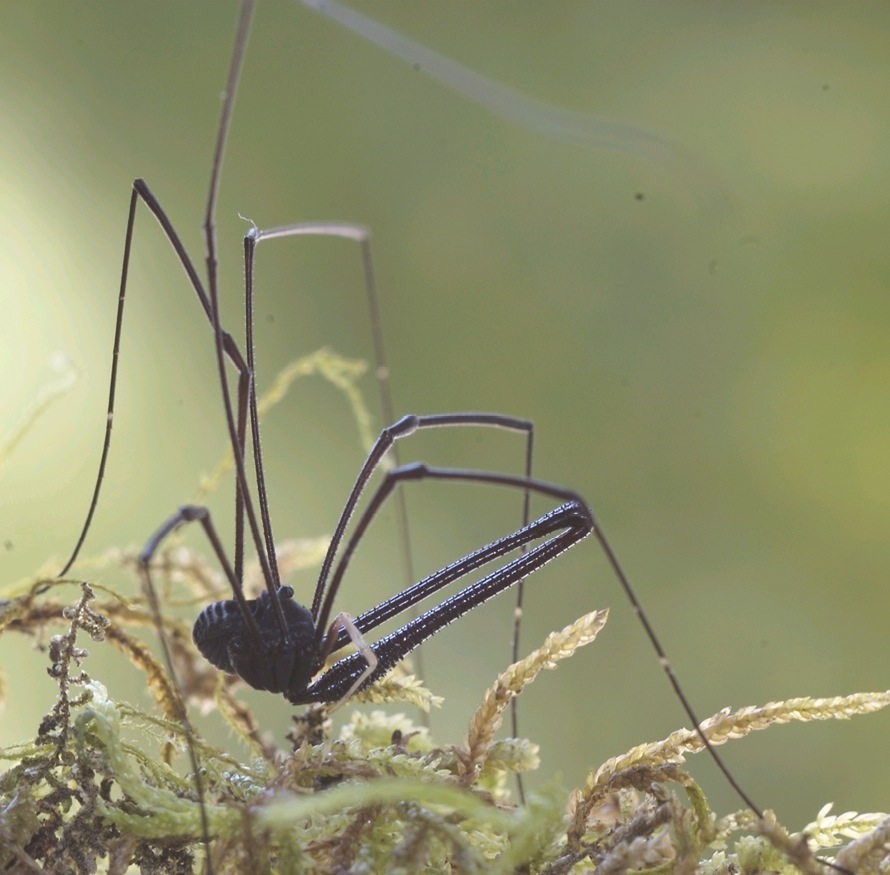
- Pantopsalis listeri

Scientific classification
- Kingdom: Animalia
- Phylum: Arthropoda
- Subphylum: Chelicerata
- Class: Arachnida
- Order: Opiliones
- Superfamily: Phalangioidea
- Family: Neopilionidae; Lawrence, 1931

Diversity
- 19 genera, 78 species

= Neopilionidae =

Family of harvestmen/daddy longlegs

The Neopilionidae are a family of harvestmen.

It has a clearly Gondwanan distribution, with species found in Australia, New Caledonia, New Zealand, South Africa and South America; they probably represent relicts of that time.

The family members range in size from the small Americovibone lancafrancoae (0.9 mm) to over 4 mm in the Enantiobuninae.

Some species of Enantiobuninae have blue pigmentation, which is rather unusual in harvestmen.

The former family "Monoscutidae" has been subsumed within the subfamily Enantiobuninae.

== Name ==
The family name is a contraction of Ancient Greek neo "new" and Latin Opilio, a genus of harvestman.

== Subdivisions ==
According to the Catalogue of Life, Neopilionidae includes 3 subfamilies, which contain a total of 27 genera and 81 species.

- Ballarrinae Hunt & Cokendolpher, 1991
  - Americovibone Hunt & Cokendolpher, 1991
  - Arrallaba Hunt & Cokendolpher, 1991
  - Ballarra Hunt & Cokendolpher, 1991
  - Plesioballarra Hunt & Cokendolpher, 1991
  - Vibone Kauri, 1961
- Enantiobuninae Mello-Leitão, 1931 (incl. Monoscutidae)
  - Accensus Taylor, 2025
  - Acihasta Forster, 1948
  - Australiscutum Taylor, 2009
  - Forsteropsalis Taylor, 2011
  - Maikukunui Taylor, 2025
  - Mangatangi Taylor, 2013
  - Megalopsalis Roewer, 1923
  - Monoscutum Forster, 1948
  - Neopantopsalis Taylor & Hunt, 2009
  - Pakaka Taylor, 2025
  - Pantopsalis Simon, 1879
  - Puwere Taylor, 2025
  - Shelob Taylor, 2025
  - Spinicrurellum Taylor, 2025
  - Templar Taylor, 2008
  - Tercentenarium Taylor, 2011
  - Thrasychiroides Soares & Soares, 1947
  - Thrasychirus Simon, 1884
  - Triascutum Taylor, 2025
  - Ungoliant Taylor, 2025
- Neopilioninae Lawrence, 1931
  - Neopilio Lawrence, 1931
- Neopilionidae incertae sedis
  - Martensopsalis Giribet & Baker, 2021
