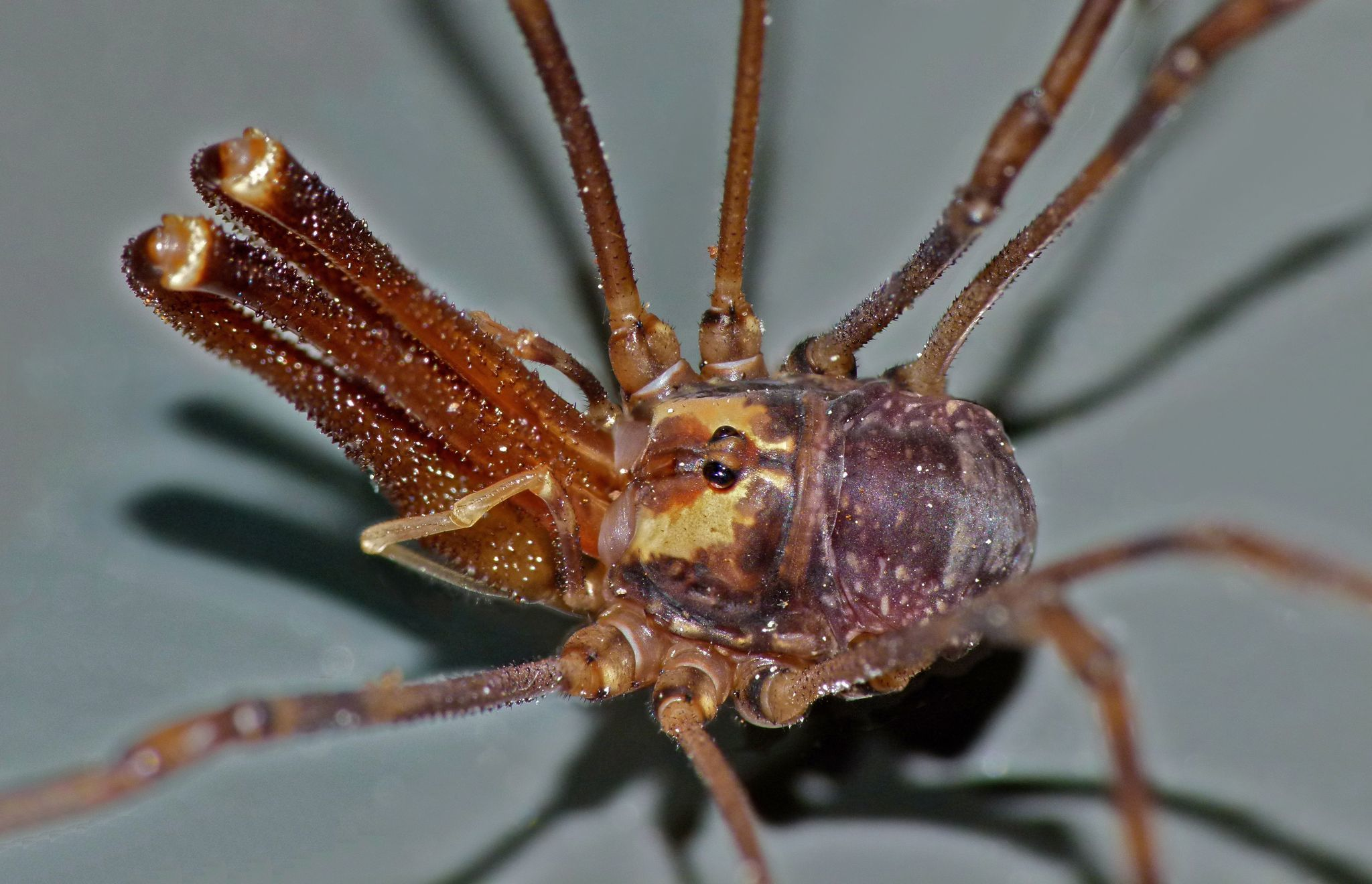
- Forsteropsalis marplesi

Scientific classification
- Kingdom: Animalia
- Phylum: Arthropoda
- Subphylum: Chelicerata
- Class: Arachnida
- Order: Opiliones
- Family: Neopilionidae
- Subfamily: Enantiobuninae
- Genus: Forsteropsalis; Taylor, 2011

= Forsteropsalis =

Genus of arachnids

Forsteropsalis is a genus of harvestmen (Opiliones) endemic to New Zealand. Males of this genus have exaggerated chelicerae weapons used in male-male competition. Forsteropsalis are opportunistic omnivores that both capture live prey and scavenge dead animal matter. The diet includes various insects, arachnids, spiders, millipedes, amphipods, and annelid worms.

== Species ==
The following species are recognised in the genus Forsteropsalis:

- F. chiltoni Hogg, 1910)
- F. distincta (Forster, 1964)
- F. grayi (Hogg, 1920)
- F. marplesi (Forster, 1944)
- F. tumida (Forster, 1944)
- F. wattsi (Hogg, 1920)
